Assassinations have formed a major plot element in various works of fiction. This article provides a list of fictional stories in which assassination features as an important plot element.  Passing mentions are omitted.
 
Assassination can be regarded as the murder of a prominent person for a motive which is broadly public and political rather than merely personal or financial.

Assassinations in fiction have attracted scholarly attention.  In Assassinations and Murder in Modern Italy: Transformations in Society and Culture, as well as analyzing Italian assassinations in their historical and cultural contexts, Stephen Gundle and Lucia Rinaldi explore the films, plays, other works of fiction, and art that the act of assassination has inspired. Nick Cullather has discussed "The Movie Version" of John F. Kennedy's assassination.

This list prefers to highlight less familiar cultural artifacts, while trying not to itemize every Ian Fleming or Agatha Christie title, or every Mafia film. The historical–historically based or historically inspired–takes precedence over the purely fictional and sensational.

Novels
 Judith (c. 800) – Old English poem based on the Book of Judith (c. 100 B.C.)
 Edward Grim, Vita S. Thomae a.k.a. Life of Thomas Becket (1180) – eyewitness account of Thomas Becket
 Das Nibelungenlied (c. 1200) – German epic poem
 Marko Marulić, Judita (1521) – Croatian epic poem
 Alexandre Dumas, père, The Black Tulip (1850) – historical novel which features the assassination of Johan and Cornelis de Witt 
 Bolesław Prus, Pharaoh (1895)
 Henryk Sienkiewicz, Quo Vadis: A Tale of the Time of Nero (1895) – historical novel about SS. Peter and Paul, Pisonian conspirators and Empress Poppaea, Emperor Nero
 Anthony Hope, Rupert of Hentzau (1898) – adventure novel and sombre finale to The Prisoner of Zenda (1894)
 J. M. Barrie, Better Dead (18??) – novella about a plot against Lord Randolph Churchill
 Jack London, The Iron Heel (1908) – violent dystopian novel
 Jack London, The Assassination Bureau, Ltd (c. 1910, published 1963) – novel half-written by London, completed by Robert L. Fish, possibly influenced by the J. M. Barrie novella, Better Dead.
 Joseph Conrad, Under Western Eyes (1911)
 Baroness Orczy, The Laughing Cavalier (1913) – historical novel about Maurice of Nassau

 John Buchan, The Thirty-Nine Steps (1915) – suspense novel; just the 1978 movie version features the attempted assassination of a fictional Greek Prime Minister
 André Malraux, Man's Fate (1933) – existential political novel
 Robert Graves, I, Claudius (1934), Claudius the God (1935) – historical novels about Roman Emperors Augustus, Tiberius, Caligula, Claudius, Nero
 John Steinbeck, In Dubious Battle (1936) – social realist novel about a Communist labour organizer supporting a strike by fruit pickers
 Sax Rohmer, President Fu Manchu (1936)
 Geoffrey Household, Rogue Male (1939)
 Arthur Koestler, Darkness at Noon (1940) – political novel about "Nikolai Rubashov" (Nikolai Bukharin, et al.)
Robert A. Heinlein, If This Goes On-- (serialized in 1940, published in the 1953 compilation Revolt in 2100)
 Bart Lytton, Hangman's Village (1943?) – topical novel about Reinhard Heydrich
 Pär Lagerkvist, The Dwarf (1944)
 Robert Penn Warren, All the King's Men (1946) – political novel about a Southern governor (Huey Long)
 Samuel Shellabarger, Prince of Foxes (1947) – historical novel about Cesare Borgia
 Josephine Tey, The Daughter of Time (1951) – historical novel about the Princes in the Tower
 Ian Fleming, James Bond series (1953–1966) – spy novel series featuring a licensed to kill protagonist who is described as having carried out assassinations, but rarely actually does so in the books themselves
 From Russia, With Love (1957) – references Andrés Nin
 Philip K. Dick, Solar Lottery (1955)  – science fiction novel with assassination as political system
 Graham Greene, The Quiet American (1955)
 Richard Condon, The Manchurian Candidate (1959)
 Elie Wiesel, Dawn (1961)
 Robert A. Heinlein, Stranger in a Strange Land (1961) – science fiction novel about a Messianic character
 Emeric Pressburger, Killing a Mouse on Sunday (1961) – filmed as Behold a Pale Horse
 Manuel Mujica Laínez, Bomarzo (1962) – historical novel about Pier Francesco Orsini
 Ben Abro, Assassination! July 14 (1963) – novel about a plot to kill Charles de Gaulle; possibly a basis for The Day of the Jackal
 Nick Carter (various authors), Run, Spy, Run (1964) – spy thriller featuring a foiled plot to kill President John F. Kennedy in September 1963; Temple of Fear (1968) – featuring a plot to assassinate Emperor Hirohito of Japan; Assault on England (1972) – spy thriller featuring multiple assassination attempts on the British cabinet, including Chancellor of the Exchequer, Minister of Defence and Foreign Secretary (all successful) and Prime Minister (unsuccessful); Agent Counter-Agent (1973) – featuring a foiled plot to assassinate the Vice President of the United States and President of Venezuela;
 Vassilis Vassilikos, Z (1967) – political novel about an opposition politician (Gregoris Lambrakis)
 Mario Puzo, The Godfather (1969)
 Frederick Forsyth, The Day of the Jackal (1971) – suspense novel about Charles de Gaulle
 Loren Singer, The Parallax View (1972)
 Trevanian, The Eiger Sanction (1972)
 Michael Crichton (as John Lange), Binary (1972) – suspense novel about a U.S. President
 George Shipway, The Paladin (1972), The Wolf Time (1973) – historical novels about Walter Tyrell, the presumed assassin of King William Rufus in 1100
 Trevanian, The Loo Sanction (1973)
 Richard Condon, Winter Kills (1974)
 Jack Higgins, The Eagle Has Landed (1975) – war novel about a plot by Himmler to capture Churchill
 Sjöwall and Wahlöö, The Terrorists (1975) – suspense novel about a Swedish Prime Minister (not Olof Palme)
 Gerald Seymour, Harry's Game (1975)
 David Littlejohn, The Man Who Killed Mick Jagger (Little, Brown, 1977)
 Matthew Eden, The Murder of Lawrence of Arabia (1979)
 Trevanian, Shibumi (1979)
 Frederick Forsyth, The Devil's Alternative (1979) – complex novel involving a plot to start rebellion in Ukraine in which the KGB chief Yuri Ivanenko is murdered
 Stephen King, The Dead Zone (1979)
 Robert Ludlum, The Bourne Identity (1980)
 Mary Renault, Funeral Games (1981) – historical novel about Roxana, Alexander IV, and others
 Harry Mulisch, The Assault (1982)
 Alan Moore, V for Vendetta (1982–1988) – graphic novel featuring numerous assassinations of governmental and quasi-governmental officials by the eponymous character, V
 Jean Van Hamme (and William Vance), XIII (1984) – graphic novel about a U.S. President
 Tom Clancy, Patriot Games (1987) – suspense novel about the Prince and Princess of Wales
 Don DeLillo, Libra (1988)
 Roderick Thorp, Devlin (1988) – suspense novel about a New York mayoral candidate
 Frederick Forsyth, The Negotiator—complex novel, in which Simon Cormack, son of President of the United States John Cormack is kidnapped for ransom (which protagonist Quinn has to deliver) and is then murdered during his return
 Jack Higgins, The Eagle Has Flown (1991) – war novel about a plot by Himmler to assassinate Hitler, Rommel and Canaris
 Jack Higgins, Eye of the Storm (1992) – suspense novel about an attack on John Major
 John Grisham, The Pelican Brief (1992) – suspense novel which opens with the assassinations of two Supreme Court justices in one night
 J. C. Pollock, Threat Case (1992)
 Tom Clancy, Debt of Honor (1994) – war novel that ends with the bombing of the Capitol Building, wiping out the entire U.S. government except for the newly confirmed Vice President
 Frederick Forsyth, The Fist of God (1994) – factual novel about supergun designer Gerald Bull
 Nicholas Shakespeare, The Dancer Upstairs (1995)
 James Ellroy, American Tabloid (1995) – novel about John F. Kennedy and the Bay of Pigs invasion
 Tom Clancy, Executive Orders (1996)
 Vince Flynn, Term Limits (1997)
 Philip Kerr, The Shot (1999) Alternate take on Kennedy assassination
 Vince Flynn, Transfer of Power (1999) – suspense novel about a U.S. President and the White House
 Boris Akunin, The State Counsellor (2000) – historical mystery novel about a Moscow governor
 Tom Clancy, The Bear and the Dragon (2000)
 Jack Higgins, Edge of Danger (2001) – suspense novel about a U.S. President and a Russian Prime Minister
 Günter Grass, Crabwalk (2002) – investigative novel about Wilhelm Gustloff
 Lee Child, Without Fail (2002)
 Tom Clancy, Red Rabbit (2002) – suspense novel about Pope John Paul II and Georgi Markov
 Ismail Kadare, The Successor (2003) – novel about Mehmet Shehu
 Barry Eisler, Hard Rain (2003)
 Nicholson Baker, Checkpoint (2004) – political novel about George W. Bush
 Jack Higgins, Dark Justice (2004) – suspense novel about a U.S. President
 Tim Green, Fourth Perimeter (2005)
 J. K Rowling, Harry Potter and the Half-Blood Prince, a fantasy novel in which Draco Malfoy is under orders to assassinate the headmaster of Hogwarts School of Witchcraft and Wizardry
 Malay Roy Choudhury, Naamgandho (2005) – Bengali novel
 Thomas A. Taylor, Mortal Shield (2008)
 Brent Weeks, The Night Angel Trilogy (2008) – fantasy series
 Jack Higgins, Sharp Shot (2009) – suspense novel about a U.S. President
 Jack Higgins, First Strike (2009) – suspense novel about a U.S. President
 Barbara Kingsolver, The Lacuna (2009) – novel about Leon Trotsky
 Leonardo Padura Fuentes, El hombre que amaba a los perros (The Man Who Loved Dogs) (2009) – novel about Leon Trotsky
 Nathan M Farrugia, The Chimera Vector (2012) – technothriller featuring deniable operatives programmed to assassinate
 David Baldacci The Innocent (2012)— features professional killer Will Robie who is an American covert operative specializing in assassinating high profile targets
 J. T. Patten, Presidential Retreat (2020) — Black ops intelligence professionals responding to a historic conspiracy attempt to save the president on Martha's Vineyard to avert a shift in geo-politics

Short stories

 Agatha Christie, "The Kidnapped Prime Minister" (1924) – Hercule Poirot short story about the kidnapping of a fictional British Prime Minister, which includes a deliberate attempt on his life
 Sir Arthur Conan Doyle, "The Adventure of the Red Circle" (1911) – Sherlock Holmes short story about a New York mob hit in London
 Liam O'Flaherty, "The Sniper" (1923)
 Ernest Hemingway, "The Killers" (1927)
 Robert A. Heinlein, Revolt in 2100 (serialized in 1940, published as a book in 1953)
 Philip K. Dick, "The Last of the Masters" (1954) – science fiction novella in which the last dictator on earth is assassinated by anarchists, successfully overthrowing the last government
 David Stanley, "Assassins List" (2014) short story with a percent of the sales donated to injured marines charities.

Plays and operas

 William Shakespeare, Henry VI, Part 3 (1590) – play about English King Henry VI
 Christopher Marlowe, Edward II (1592) – play about English King Edward II
 William Shakespeare, Julius Caesar (probably 1599) – play about Julius Caesar
 William Shakespeare, Hamlet (between 1600 and summer 1602) – play about Hamlet
 William Shakespeare, Macbeth (between 1603 and 1606) – play about King Duncan
 Lope de Vega, Fuente Ovejuna (between 1612 and 1614) – play about the village of Fuente Ovejuna
 Pierre Corneille, Cinna (1639) – play about Augustus and Cinna
 Jean Racine, Britannicus (1669) – play about Britannicus
 Takeda Izumo, Miyoshi Shōraku, and Namiki Senryū, Kanadehon Chūshingura (1748) – puppet play about the Forty-seven Ronin
 Friedrich Schiller, Mary Stuart (1800) – play about Mary, Queen of Scots and Queen Elizabeth I
 Zacharias Werner, Attila, König der Hunnen (1809) – tragedy about Attila the Hun
 Victor Hugo, Le roi s'amuse (1832) – scathing, banned play about French King Francis I (and, indirectly, King Louis-Philippe)
 Eugène Scribe and Daniel Auber, Gustave III, ou Le bal masqué (1833) – opera about Swedish King Gustav III
 In Polish poet Juliusz Słowacki's 1833 play Kordian, the teen title hero plots to assassinate Russian Tsar Nicholas I—but fails to carry through.
 Giuseppe Bardari and Gaetano Donizetti, Maria Stuarda (1835) – opera based on Schiller's play
 Lőrinc Tóth, Die beiden Lászlós (a.k.a. Két László, Both Laszlos) (1839) – play about Ulrich of Celje and László Hunyadi
 Antonio García Gutiérrez, Simón Bocanegra (1843) – play about Simone Boccanegra
 Béni Egressy and Ferenc Erkel, Hunyadi László (1844) – opera about Ulrich of Celje and László Hunyadi, based on Lőrinc Tóth's play
 Temistocle Solera (and Francesco Maria Piave) and Giuseppe Verdi, Attila (1846) – opera based on Werner's tragedy
 Francesco Maria Piave and Giuseppe Verdi, Macbeth (1847) – opera based on Shakespeare's tragedy
 Francesco Maria Piave and Giuseppe Verdi, Rigoletto (1851) – opera based on Hugo's Le roi s'amuse, with a fictional Duke of Mantua replacing French King Francis I
 Francesco Maria Piave and Giuseppe Verdi, Simon Boccanegra (1857) – opera based on García Gutiérrez's play
 Antonio Somma and Giuseppe Verdi, Un ballo in maschera (1859) – opera about Swedish King Gustav III
 Michel Carré and Ambroise Thomas, Hamlet (1868) – opera based on Shakespeare's tragedy
 Henrik Ibsen, Emperor and Galilean (1873) – play about Roman Emperor Julian the Apostate
 Richard Wagner, Götterdämmerung (1876) – opera about the hero Siegfried
 Alfred Lord Tennyson, Becket (188?) – play about Thomas Becket
 Modest Mussorgsky, Khovanshchina (1880) – opera about Ivan Khovansky
 Oscar Wilde, Salomé (1891) – tragedy about John the Baptist and Salome
 Abraham Goldfaden, Judith and Holofernes (1892)
 August Strindberg, Gustaf III (1902) – play about Swedish King Gustav III
 Richard Strauss, Salome (1905) – opera based on Wilde's tragedy
 Eugene O'Neill, The Emperor Jones (1920) – play about a Caribbean dictator
 Bertolt Brecht, The Life of Edward II of England (1924) – play about English King Edward II
 Kathleen de Jaffa and Louis Gruenberg, The Emperor Jones (1933) – opera based on O'Neill's play
 Oscar Ryan et al., Eight Men Speak (1933) – play about Tim Buck
 Albert Camus, The Just Assassins (1949) – play about Russian Grand Duke Sergei
 T.S. Eliot, Murder in the Cathedral (1935) – play about Thomas Becket
 Ildebrando Pizzetti, Assassinio nella cattedrale (1958) – opera about Thomas Becket
 Jean Anouilh, Becket or The Honour of God (1959) – play about Thomas Becket
 Peter Weiss, Marat/Sade (1963) – musical play about Jean-Paul Marat
 Peter Shaffer, The Royal Hunt of the Sun (1964) – play about Atahualpa
 Felix Lützkendorf, Dallas, 22. November (1965) – play about John F. Kennedy and Lee Harvey Oswald
 Manuel Mujica Laínez and Alberto Ginastera, Bomarzo (1967) – opera based on Mujica Laínez's novel
 James Prideaux, The Last of Mrs. Lincoln (1972) – play about Abraham Lincoln
 Carlisle Floyd, Willie Stark (1981) – opera based on Robert Penn Warren's novel All the King's Men, in turn inspired by the life of the Louisiana governor Huey Long.
 Rolf Hochhuth, Soldiers (1967) – play about Władysław Sikorski
 Eric Schlosser, Americans (1985) – play about William McKinley and Leon Czolgosz
 John Weidman and Stephen Sondheim, Assassins (1990) – musical
 Alice Goodman and John Adams, The Death of Klinghoffer (1991) – opera about Leon Klinghoffer
 Michael Kunze and Sylvester Levay, Elisabeth (1992) – musical about "Sissi", Queen Empress of Austro-Hungary
 David Ives, Variations on the Death of Trotsky (1993) – comedy about Leon Trotsky
 Emily Mann, Execution of Justice (199?) – play about George Moscone and Harvey Milk
 Pierre Brault, Blood on the Moon (2000) – play about D'Arcy McGee
 Pradeep Dalavi, Me Nathuram Godse Boltoy (2000?) – play about Mahatma Gandhi
 Lee Blessing, Whores (2002) – play about Ita Ford, Dorothy Kazel, Maura Clarke, and Jean Donovan
 Henning Mankell, Politik (2010) – play about Olof Palme

Films

The list is organized chronologically by year of release, rather than year of production.
Within each year, films based on genuine historical events are listed first, followed by any purely fictional entries.

1890s
 The Execution of Mary Stuart – 1895 Re-enactment of the beheading of Mary, Queen of Scots by Alfred Clark
 Néron essayant des poisons sur un esclave – 1896 French short by Georges Hatot shows Roman Emperor Nero practising a favoured assassination method, poison, on a slave
 Mort de Marat – 1897 French hand-coloured short by Georges Hatot about the 1793 assassination of Jean-Paul Marat in his bath by Charlotte Corday
 L'Assassinat du duc de Guise – 1897 French short by Georges Hatot on the 1588 assassination of the Duc de Guise by King Henri III at the Château de Blois
 La mort de Robespierre – 1897 French short by Georges Hatot on the 1794 execution without trial of Maximilien Robespierre

1900s
 Hamlet – from 1900 to 2000, dozens of film adaptations, in various languages, of the tragedy by William Shakespeare.
 Le Duel d'Hamlet – 1900 French sound short by Clément Maurice in which Hamlet (Sarah Bernhardt) is killed by Laertes (Pierre Magnier), based on Shakespeare's tragedy
 Execution of Czolgosz with Panorama of Auburn Prison – 1901 short by Edwin S. Porter recreates the electrocution of U.S. President McKinley's assassin in 1901
 The Martyred Presidents – 1901 short by Edwin S. Porter memorializes the three murdered U.S. Presidents, Lincoln, Garfield, and McKinley

 L'Assassinat de Mac Kinley – 1902 French short by Ferdinand Zecca about the assassination of U.S. Président Guillaume Mac Kinley (French rendering of William McKinley) in 1901
 Assassinat de la famille royale de Serbie – 1903 French short by Lucien Nonguet about the assassination of Serbian King Alexander I and his consort, Queen Draga in 1903
 L'Assassinat du grand-duc Serge – 1905 French short by Lucien Nonguet about the assassination of Russian Grand Duke Sergei by a terrorist in 1905
 François Ier et Triboulet (a.k.a. The King and the Jester) – 1907 French short by Georges Méliès about King Francis I and his jester Triboulet, who form the basis for Hugo's play Le roi s'amuse (and Verdi's opera Rigoletto)
 La prophétesse de Thèbes – 1907 French short by Georges Méliès in which a prophetess foresees the assassination of the King of Thebes

 The Assassination of the Duke of Guise – 1908 French short by Charles Le Bargy on the 1588 assassination of the Duc de Guise by King Henri III (Le Bargy) at the Château de Blois
 Macbeth – 1908 short by J. Stuart Blackton, based on the tragedy by Shakespeare, in which King Duncan (Charles Kent) is murdered by his thane Macbeth (William V. Ranous), loosely based on the death of Duncan I in 1040 – followed by numerous other versions
 La mort de Lincoln (a.k.a. La fin de Lincoln) – 1909 French short by Albert Capellani about the assassination and death of President Lincoln (Henri Desfontaines) in 1865
 Judith et Holopherne – 1909 French short by Louis Feuillade on the beheading of Assyrian general Holofernes by Biblical heroine Judith (Renée Carl), based on the Book of Judith
 A Fool's Revenge – 1909 film by D. W. Griffith in which a jester and protective father (Charles Inslee) arranges the assassination of his lascivious lord (Owen Moore), based on Hugo's play Le roi s'amuse and Verdi's opera Rigoletto

1910s
 Becket (a.k.a. The Martyrdom of Thomas A. [sic] Becket, Archbishop of Canterbury) – 1910 short by Charles Kent about the assassination of Archbishop of Canterbury Thomas Becket (Kent) in 1170
 The Assassination of Admiral Coligny – 1910 short by the Urban Trading Company about the murder of French Huguenot leader Coligny in 1572 just prior to the St. Bartholomew's Day massacre
 Chūshingura (a.k.a. A Tale of Loyal Retainers) – c. 1910 Japanese film by Shōzō Makino, starring Matsunosuke Onoe, about the Forty-seven rōnin, a group of samurai who plotted to avenge their lord's death in 1701 – also, earlier 1907 short by Ryo Konishi
 L'assassinat d'Henri III – 1911 French short by Henri Desfontaines and Louis Mercanton on the mortal wounding of King Henri III in 1589 by an anti-Protestant Dominican friar
 Ulrih Celjski i Vladislav Hunjadi – 1911 Serbian short by Čiča Ilija Stanojević, the first Serbian film, about the murder of Hungarian regent Ulrih Celjski (Stanojević) in 1456 and the reprisal against Vladislav Hunjadi by King Vladislav V, based on Erkel's opera
 Karadjordje (Карађорђе) – 1911 Serbian film by Čiča Ilija Stanojević, the first Serbian feature, about the 1817 assassination of Karadjordje Petrović, leader of the First Serbian Uprising against the Ottomans, by agents of Prince Miloš Obrenović
 Guy Fawkes and the Gunpowder Plot – 1911 short by the Urban Trading Company about the 1605 Gunpowder Plot to blow up Parliament and James VI and I
 Il Ballo in maschera – 1911 Italian short by Ugo Falena based on Verdi's 1859 opera, inspired by the 1792 shooting of Swedish King Gustav III at a masquerade ball

 Judith of Bethulia – 1914 film by D. W. Griffith on the beheading of Assyrian general Holofernes (Henry B. Walthall) by Biblical heroine Judith (Blanche Sweet), based on the Book of Judith
 The Birth of a Nation – 1915 film by D. W. Griffith recreates the assassination of President Lincoln (Joseph Henabery) by a famous tragedian (Raoul Walsh) inside Ford's Theatre in 1865

 La Tragica fine di Caligula imperator – 1917 Italian short by Ugo Falena about the assassination of Roman Emperor Caligula (Raffaello Mariani) by Chaerea (Elio Gioppo) in AD 41

1920s
 Giuditta e Oloferne – 1920 Italian film by Aldo Molinari on the beheading of Assyrian general Holofernes by Biblical heroine Judith (Ileana Leonidoff), based on the Book of Judith – also, 1928 version by Baldassarre Negroni
 Das Fest der schwarzen Tulpe – 1920 German film by Marie Luise Droop and Muhsin Ertuğrul about the staged lynching of Dutch politicians Johan and Cornelis de Witt in 1672, based on the novel by Alexandre Dumas
 The Black Tulip – 1921 Anglo-Dutch film by Maurits Binger and Frank Richardson about the staged lynching of Dutch politicians Johan and Cornelis de Witt in 1672, based on the novel by Alexandre Dumas

 Kaiserin Elisabeth von Österreich – 1921 German film by Rolf Raffé about "Sissi", Queen Empress of Austro-Hungary (Carla Nelsen) and her 1898 assassination by an anarchist
 In the Days of Buffalo Bill – 1922 serial by Edward Laemmle included the assassination of President Lincoln (J. Herbert Frank) by a famous tragedian (William F. Moran) in 1865
 Young Medardus – 1923 Austrian film by Michael Curtiz in which young Viennese, following the occupation of Vienna in 1809, plan to assassinate Napoleon, based on the play by Schnitzler
 Becket – 1923 film by George Ridgwell about the assassination of Archbishop of Canterbury Thomas Becket (Frank R. Benson) in 1170, based on the play by Tennyson
 Rupert of Hentzau – 1923 film by Victor Heerman in which the King of Ruritania (Bert Lytell) is assassinated (but not his look-alike, as in the novel by Anthony Hope) – also, earlier 1916 version with Henry Ainley
 The Dramatic Life of Abraham Lincoln – 1924 film by Phil Rosen depicts the career and the assassination of President Lincoln (George A. Billings) by a famous tragedian (William F. Moran) in 1865
 Die Nibelungen: Siegfried – 1924 German film by Fritz Lang about the hero Siegfried and his assassination by the Burgundian Hagen, based on the c. 1200 epic poem The Nibelungenlied
 Die Nibelungen: Kriemhilds Rache – 1924 German sequel by Fritz Lang in which Kriemhild, avenging her husband Siegfried, kills Hagen in a plot involving her second husband, Hunnish King Etzel
 Wallenstein, 2. Teil – Wallensteins Tod – 1925 German film by Rolf Randolf in which Wallenstein (Fritz Greiner), supreme Habsburg commander during the Thirty Years' War, is murdered in 1634 by an English captain under his command, at the insistence of the Emperor
 Ben-Hur – 1925 film by Fred Niblo in which a Jewish nobleman is sentenced to the galleys after a perceived assassination attempt on Valerius Gratus, the Roman Procurator of Judea
 Napoléon – 1927 French film by Abel Gance, about the early career of Napoleon Bonaparte (Albert Dieudonné), includes the assassination of Jean-Paul Marat (Antonin Artaud) in 1793
 Das Schicksal derer von Habsburg (The Fate of the von Habsburgs) – 1928 German film by Rolf Raffé about the assassinations of "Sissi", Queen Empress of Austro-Hungary (Erna Morena) in 1898, and Archduke Franz Ferdinand and his wife in 1914

1930s
 Abraham Lincoln – 1930 film by D.W. Griffith about the assassination of President Abraham Lincoln (Walter Huston)
 Rasputin and the Empress – 1932 film by Richard Boleslawski about the murdered monk, Rasputin (Lionel Barrymore) 
 Scarface – 1932 film by Howard Hawks about a gangster (Paul Muni), based on Al Capone, includes incidents based on the murders of James Colosimo in 1920, Dion O'Banion in 1924, and the Saint Valentine's Day massacre in 1929
 Hans Westmar – 1933 banned German propaganda film by Franz Wenzler about a murdered stormtrooper, based on the life of Nazi martyr Horst Wessel, immortalized by the Nazi Party anthem "Die Fahne hoch"
 The Man Who Dared – 1933 film by Hamilton MacFadden about the assassination of an immigrant mayor of Chicago (Preston Foster), based on Anton Cermak, killed earlier in 1933 during the attempted murder of President-elect Roosevelt by a delusional anarchist
 The Emperor Jones – 1933 film by Dudley Murphy where, on a Caribbean island, an escaped U.S. convict (Paul Robeson) has become a self-styled Emperor, but is now hunted by his rebellious subjects, based on the play by Nobel laureate Eugene O'Neill
 Willem van Oranje – 1934 Dutch film by Jan Teunissen, about William of Orange (Cor van der Lugt Melsert) leading the Dutch Revolt, may include the 1582 attempt, by pistol, by a Spanish merchant's assistant, or the 1584 assassination, again by pistol, by a French Catholic bounty hunter
 Cleopatra – 1934 film by Cecil B. DeMille, about the Egyptian queen (Claudette Colbert), includes the assassination of Julius Caesar (Warren William) in 44 BC.
 The Iron Duke – 1934 film by Victor Saville about the contrived execution of Marshal Ney for treason by French King Louis XVIII in 1815, during the White Terror which followed the Bourbon Restoration
 The Man Who Knew Too Much – 1934 film by Alfred Hitchcock about a British family on holiday in Switzerland who become involved in an assassination plot
 The Prisoner of Shark Island – 1936 film by John Ford about the imprisonment of Dr. Samuel Mudd, following the Lincoln assassination in 1865
 The Plainsman – 1936 film by Cecil B. DeMille includes the murder of lawman Wild Bill Hickok (Gary Cooper) in 1876
 Fury – 1936 film by Fritz Lang in which an accused man (Spencer Tracy) persecutes those who nearly lynched him, inspired by the 1933 Brooke Hart lynching case where the California Governor colluded with the mob
 Secret Agent – 1936 film by Alfred Hitchcock about a British spy (John Gielgud) sent to assassinate a German agent
 They Won't Forget – 1937 film by Mervyn LeRoy about the lynching of a New York factory owner, based on the 1915 Leo Frank case, starring Claude Rains
 I, Claudius – 1937 film by Josef von Sternberg on political violence in ancient Rome, as observed by Emperor Claudius (Charles Laughton), involving the rumoured assassination of Emperor Tiberius by Emperor Caligula (Emlyn Williams), and the assassinations of Caligula and Caesonia – unfinished, but footage survives
 The Man in the Barn – 1937 dramatized documentary short by Jacques Tourneur which explores the theory that President Lincoln's assassin did not die in a Maryland barn in 1865 but rather as "David E. George" in Oklahoma in 1903
 Peter the First, Part Two (Пётр Первый) – 1938 Soviet film by Vladimir Petrov in which Tsar Peter the Great (Nikolai Simonov) has his son, Tsarevich Alexei (Nikolai Cherkasov), tortured and executed in 1718 for plotting against him
 Frontier Marshal – 1939 film by Allan Dwan in which Doc Halliday (Caesar Romero) is killed by Curly Bill (Joe Sawyer).
 Jesse James – 1939 film by Henry King about the assassination of outlaw Jesse James (Tyrone Power) 
 Juarez – 1939 film by William Dieterle about the 1867 execution of Mexican Emperor Maximilian by President Juárez (Paul Muni)
 Five Came Back – 1939 film by John Farrow in which the crash of a passenger plane in the Amazon rainforest allows an anarchist assassin (Joseph Calleia) to re-evaluate himself

1940s
 A Dispatch from Reuter's – 1940 film by William Dieterle in which Paul Reuter proves the value of his telegraphic news service by reporting the assassination of President Lincoln in 1865
 Brigham Young – 1940 film by Henry Hathaway in which Joseph Smith (Vincent Price) is killed by an angry mob.
 Foreign Correspondent – 1940 film by Alfred Hitchcock in which a diplomat's decoy is assassinated in Amsterdam
 Man Hunt – 1941 film by Fritz Lang, starring Walter Pidgeon and George Sanders, based on Geoffrey Household's 1939 novel, Rogue Male.  A British hunter vacationing in the Bavarian Alps near the Berghof, Hitler's home in Berchtesgaden, gets Hitler in his gun sight and ponders whether or not he should shoot him.
 Tennessee Johnson – 1942 film by William Dieterle about Vice President Andrew Johnson, who assumes the Presidency following the assassination of Abraham Lincoln in 1865
 Hangmen Also Die – 1943 film by Fritz Lang about the 1942 assassination of Nazi Reinhard Heydrich
 Hitler's Madman – 1943 film by Douglas Sirk about the 1942 assassination of Nazi Reinhard Heydrich and the subsequent reprisal against the Czech village of Lidice
 Ivan the Terrible, Part I – 1944 Soviet film by Sergei Eisenstein about the suspected poisoning in 1560 of Tsarina Anastasia, consort of Tsar Ivan IV (Nikolai Cherkasov)
 Rome, Open City – Palme d'Or-winning, Oscar-nominated 1945 Italian film by Roberto Rossellini in which Italian Resistance leaders are tortured to death by the Gestapo
 The Murderers Are Among Us – 1946 German film by Wolfgang Staudte about a demobilized Berliner who plans to assassinate his former officer, a war criminal
 The Killers – 1946 film by Robert Siodmak about two hitmen, starring Burt Lancaster and based on the story by Nobel laureate Ernest Hemingway
 All the King's Men – 1949 film by Robert Rossen about the assassination of Southern governor Willie Stark (Broderick Crawford), inspired by the 1935 death of Louisiana governor Huey Long
 Border Incident – 1949 film by Anthony Mann in which a Mexican federal PJF agent (Ricardo Montalbán), undercover as a bracero, is targeted by corrupt U.S. ranchers
 Prince of Foxes – 1949 film by Henry King in which an artist (Tyrone Power) and an assassin join forces against Cesare Borgia in the Italian Renaissance

1950s
 The Sound of Fury – 1950 film by Cy Endfield in which two kidnappers (Frank Lovejoy, Lloyd Bridges) are lynched after a journalist's provocation, inspired by the 1933 Brooke Hart lynching case where the California Governor colluded with the mob
 The Gunfighter – 1950 Western by Henry King in which a notorious gunfighter (Gregory Peck) is shot in the back by a tyro, for the sake of the fame
 Quo Vadis – 1951 film by Mervyn LeRoy, about the persecution of early Christians, involves the crucifixion of Saint Peter (in AD 64), then the murder of Empress Poppaea by Emperor Nero (Peter Ustinov), and the mercy killing of Nero by his Christian friend Acte, inspired by the suicide of Nero in AD 68
 Murder in the Cathedral – 1951 film by George Hoellering about the assassination of Archbishop of Canterbury Thomas Becket (John Groser) in 1170, based on the play by T.S. Eliot
 The Desert Fox – 1951 film by Henry Hathaway, about Field Marshal Rommel (James Mason), includes his failed assassination by British commandos in 1941 and his role in the Stauffenberg plot against Adolf Hitler
 The Tall Target – 1951 film by Anthony Mann about a conspiracy against Abraham Lincoln, known as the "Baltimore Plot", before his 1861 presidential inauguration
 The Magic Face – 1951 film by Frank Tuttle where an actor (Luther Adler) becomes Adolf Hitler's valet only to kill and replace him
 The Enforcer – 1951 film by Bretaigne Windust (and Raoul Walsh) about the Murder, Inc. group of professional hitmen, starring Humphrey Bogart

 Viva Zapata! – 1952 film by Elia Kazan about the murders of Francisco Madero and Emiliano Zapata (Marlon Brando) during the Mexican Revolution
 The Secret People – 1952 film by Thorold Dickinson in which a plot to assassinate a European dictator goes awry, killing an innocent bystander
 Julius Caesar – 1953 film by Joseph L. Mankiewicz about the assassination of Julius Caesar (Louis Calhern) in the Roman Senate on the Ides of March, 44 BC, adapted from Shakespeare's tragedy
 Lucrèce Borgia – 1953 French film by Christian-Jaque in which César Borgia (Pedro Armendáriz) plots the assassination of the Duke of Milan (Gilles Quéant), the first husband of his sister Lucrèce (Martine Carol), then plots again against her second husband, Alphonse of Aragon (Massimo Serato), in 1498
 Canaris – 1954 West German film by Alfred Weidenmann about how the assassination of Nazi Reinhard Heydrich in 1942 fails to prevent the arrest and execution of Abwehr chief and British agent Wilhelm Canaris in 1945
 Suddenly – 1954 film by Lewis Allen about a would-be presidential assassin (Frank Sinatra)
 Jackboot Mutiny (a.k.a. It Happened on 20 July) – 1955 West German film by G.W. Pabst about the Stauffenberg plot against Adolf Hitler, starring Bernhard Wicki
 Prince of Players – 1955 film by Philip Dunne about the assassination of Abraham Lincoln (Stanley Hall) by John Wilkes Booth (John Derek)
 The Plot to Assassinate Hitler (Der 20. Juli) – 1955 West German film by Falk Harnack about the Stauffenberg plot against Adolf Hitler, starring Wolfgang Preiss
 Ernst Thälmann – Führer seiner Klasse – 1955 East German film by Kurt Maetzig in which Ernst Thälmann, German Communist Party leader, is murdered in Buchenwald in 1944
 Sissi – 1955 Austrian film and sequels, by Ernst Marischka, commemorate "Sissi", Queen Empress of Austro-Hungary (Romy Schneider), although none depict her 1898 assassination by an anarchist
 Alexander the Great – 1956 film by Robert Rossen in which Alexander (Richard Burton) ascends the throne of Macedon after the assassination of King Philip (Fredric March) in 336 BC.
 Mio figlio Nerone (a.k.a. My Son Nero and Nero's Big Weekend) – 1956 Italian comedy by Steno in which mad Roman Emperor Nero tries over and over to assassinate his mother Agrippina (Gloria Swanson), amongst others
 I Killed Wild Bill Hickok – 1956 Western by Richard Talmadge about the assassination of lawman Wild Bill Hickok (Tom Brown) in 1876, loosely based on the story of Hickok's assassin
 Anastasia – 1956 film by Anatole Litvak concerns a mysterious woman from a Parisian asylum (Ingrid Bergman) who might be Russian Grand Duchess Anastasia, survivor of the murder of her family in 1918
 The Green Man – 1956 comedy by Robert Day and Basil Dearden about an assassin (Alastair Sim) and a Cabinet minister
 The Man Who Knew Too Much – 1956 remake by Alfred Hitchcock about an American family on vacation in Morocco who become involved in an assassination plot
 Omar Khayyam – 1957 film by William Dieterle in which the famous poet Omar Khayyam (Cornel Wilde) foils a plot by the sect of Assassins to kill the sultan's son
 I Was Monty's Double – 1958 film by John Guillermin in which the actor (M.E. Clifton-James as himself) hired to impersonate British Field Marshal Montgomery is subject to German aeroplane and commando attacks
 Ivan the Terrible, Part II – 1958 Soviet film by Sergei Eisenstein about a plot by his boyars to assassinate Tsar Ivan IV (Nikolai Cherkasov), c. 1565
 Ashes and Diamonds – 1958 Polish film by Andrzej Wajda about two Home Army fighters ordered to assassinate a Communist commissar
 Zamach – 1959 Polish film by Jerzy Passendorfer about the assassination of Franz Kutschera, SS Police Chief of Warsaw, by Home Army fighters in 1944
 Ben-Hur – 1959 film by William Wyler in which a Jewish nobleman is sentenced to the galleys after a perceived assassination attempt on Valerius Gratus, the Roman Procurator of Judea
 North West Frontier – 1959 film by J. Lee Thompson, set in India in 1905, where a Hindu maharajah is assassinated by Moslem rebels and a British captain (Kenneth More) must defend his young heir

1960s
 Esther and the King – 1960 film by Raoul Walsh and Mario Bava about Persian Queen Esther and her husband King Ahasuerus, based on the Book of Esther
 Khovanshchina – 1960 Soviet film by Vera Stroyeva, starring Mark Reizen, based on Mussorgsky's opera
 Murder, Inc. – 1960 film by Stuart Rosenberg about the Murder, Inc. group of professional hitmen, starring Stuart Whitman
 The Gleiwitz Case – 1961 East German film by Gerhard Klein in which Nazis plan to murder a concentration camp inmate dressed in Polish uniform as a pretext to invade Poland, based on the 1939 Gleiwitz incident
 Vanina Vanini – 1961 Italian film by Roberto Rossellini, set in 1824 during the Risorgimento, when a Carbonari revolutionary (Laurent Terzieff) plans to assassinate a traitor to the secret society, loosely based on the novella by Stendhal which does not involve assassination
 Blast of Silence – 1961 film by Allen Baron where a hitman (Baron) stalks a mob lord during Christmas
 Becket oder Die Ehre Gottes – 1962 West German television film by Rainer Wolffhardt about the assassination of Archbishop of Canterbury Thomas Becket (Heinz Baumann) in 1170, based on the play by Anouilh
 Shinobi no Mono (a.k.a. Band of Assassins) – 1962 Japanese film by Satsuo Yamamoto in which two ninjas vie to assassinate warlord Oda Nobunaga in the 1570s
 Chushingura: Hana no Maki, Yuki no Maki – 1962 Japanese film by Hiroshi Inagaki about the Forty-seven Ronin, a group of samurai who plotted to avenge their lord's death in 1701, starring Toshirō Mifune
 The Manchurian Candidate – 1962 film by John Frankenheimer, adapted from the novel by Richard Condon, in which a U.S. Korean War P.O.W. (Laurence Harvey) is brainwashed into assassinating a Presidential candidate, thus allowing a Communist agent to become President
 Dr. No – 1962 thriller by Terence Young about the murder of British agents in Jamaica, and the investigation by an agent, James Bond (Sean Connery), who is "licensed to kill"
 Cleopatra – 1963 film by Joseph L. Mankiewicz, about the Egyptian queen (Elizabeth Taylor), includes the assassinations of several historical figures, Pompey, Pothinus, Julius Caesar, Caesarion and, unhistorically, Egyptian ambassador Sosigenes
 Nine Hours to Rama – 1963 film by Mark Robson about Mahatma Gandhi and his assassin (Horst Buchholz)
 The Ugly American – 1963 film by George Englund, starring Marlon Brando, in which a Southeast Asian nationalist revolutionary is assassinated by a Communist double agent
 The Little Soldier – 1963 French film by Jean-Luc Godard about an agent for French Intelligence who is assigned to kill a sympathizer of the Algerian FLN
 From Russia with Love – 1963 film by Terence Young in which James Bond and an ally are targeted for assassination by a SPECTRE agent
 Becket – 1964 film by Peter Glenville about the assassination of Archbishop of Canterbury Thomas Becket (Richard Burton) in 1170, based on the play by Anouilh
 Kustaa III – 1964 Finnish television film by Mirjam Himberg about the 1792 shooting of Swedish King Gustav III (Lasse Pöysti) by a disgruntled officer (Uolevi Vahteristo) at a masquerade ball

 Atentát – 1964 Czechoslovakian film by Jiří Sequens about the assassination of Nazi Reinhard Heydrich by Czech commandos in 1942
 The Trial of Lee Harvey Oswald – 1964 film by Larry Buchanan in which the accused assassin (Charles Mazyrack) of U.S. President Kennedy is not himself assassinated but instead receives a fair trial in Dallas
 The Fall of the Roman Empire – 1964 film by Anthony Mann about the rumoured assassination of Marcus Aurelius (Alec Guinness) in AD 180 and the actual one of Commodus (Christopher Plummer) in 192
 Behold a Pale Horse – 1964 film by Fred Zinnemann about a Spanish Civil War grudge between an exiled guerrilla (Gregory Peck) and a policeman (Anthony Quinn)
 De l'assassinat considéré comme un des beaux-arts (Assassination Considered as One of the Fine Arts) – 1964 French film by Maurice Boutel lists a role for a "President of Gentlemen Amateurs" (Anthony Stuart)
 Shaheed – 1965 Indian (Hindi) film by S. Ram Sharma about Indian nationalist Bhagat Singh and the assassination of British police superintendent J.P. Saunders in 1928
 Thunderball – 1965 film by Terence Young that opens with James Bond's first on-screen assassination, of an enemy agent
 The Intelligence Men – 1965 comedy by Robert Asher in which two Londoners (Morecambe and Wise) foil an assassination plot at the ballet
 Harum Scarum – 1965 musical comedy by Gene Nelson in which a band of ancient Assassins want a singer (Elvis Presley) to kill a desert king
 Lee Oswald – Assassin – 1966 television film by Rudolph Cartier about the 1963 assassination of U.S. President Kennedy and the subsequent murder of his assassin (Tony Bill), based on a play by Felix Lützkendorf
 The Battle of Algiers – Oscar-nominated 1966 Italian film by Gillo Pontecorvo about political violence during the Algerian War
 Pharaoh – Oscar-nominated 1966 Polish film by Jerzy Kawalerowicz about the assassination of a reformist Egyptian pharaoh, adapted from the novel by Bolesław Prus, and eerily echoing the death of John F. Kennedy in 1963
 The Man Called Flintstone – 1966 animated thriller by William Hanna and Joseph Barbera in which Bedrock quarry employee and family man Fred Flintstone becomes the target of assassins when he takes the place of a out-of-action secret agent who looks exactly like him
 Our Man Flint – 1966 spoof by Daniel Mann in which a retired secret agent (James Coburn) avoids assassination by mad scientists bent on world domination
 Ilbon cheonhwanggwa poktanuisa (a.k.a. The Japanese Emperor and the Martyrs) – 1967 South Korean film by Lee Yong-min, about twin attacks in 1932 by Korean nationalists against Japan, the failed Tokyo attack by Lee Bong-chang on Emperor Hirohito, and the successful Shanghai attack by Yoon Bong-gil, mortally wounding General Shirakawa, commander of the Shanghai Expeditionary Army and former War Minister, and wounding Admiral Nomura, General Ueda, Ambassador Shigemitsu, and Consul General Murai
 L'attentato di Serajevo – 1967 Italian television film by Giuseppe Fina about the assassination of Austrian Archduke Franz Ferdinand and his wife in 1914
 Das Attentat – Der Tod des Engelbert Dollfuß – 1967 West German television film by Franz Peter Wirth about the assassination of Austrian Chancellor Engelbert Dollfuß in 1934
 Das Attentat: L.D. Trotzki – Tod im Exil – 1967 West German television film by August Everding about Leon Trotsky (Peter Lühr) and "Frank Jacson" (Michael Degen) in 1940, based on a book by Leandro A. Sánchez Salazar (Hannes Messemer)
 The Night of the Generals – 1967 thriller by Anatole Litvak indirectly about the Stauffenberg plot to assassinate Adolf Hitler

 Marat/Sade – 1967 film by Peter Brook in which the inmates of an insane asylum in 1808, under the direction of the Marquis de Sade, act out the assassination of Jean-Paul Marat in 1793, based the play by Peter Weiss
 The St. Valentine's Day Massacre – 1967 film by Roger Corman about the 1929 Saint Valentine's Day Massacre of members of the Moran gang by Capone gunmen
 Le Samouraï – 1967 French film by Jean-Pierre Melville about a remorseless hitman (Alain Delon)
 The President's Analyst – 1967 comedy by Theodore J. Flicker in which the U.S. President's personal psychiatrist (James Coburn) must evade assassination attempts by U.S. government agencies, the "CEA" and the "FBR" 
 You Only Live Twice – 1967 film by Lewis Gilbert that opens with James Bond being the target of a faked assassination
 The Caesars – 1968 ITV miniseries by Derek Bennett on political violence in ancient Rome, involving the murders of members of the Imperial family – Postumus, Germanicus, Drusus, "Castor", and others
 Sarajevski atentat – 1968 Yugoslavian (Serbo-Croatian) film by Fadil Hadžić in which a World War II partisan in Sarajevo is told the events of 1914 with the assassination of Austrian Archduke Franz Ferdinand (Bert Sotlar) and his wife by a Young Bosnia nationalist (Predrag Finci)
 If.... – Palme d'Or-winning 1968 film by Lindsay Anderson in which rebellious English public school students move to open revolt and assassinate their headmaster, inspired by the 1968 Paris riots and the 1605 Gunpowder Plot
 Nobody Runs Forever (a.k.a. The High Commissioner) – 1968 film by Ralph Thomas in which an Australian policeman (Rod Taylor) arrives in London and prevents the assassination of the Australian High Commissioner (Christopher Plummer)
 Che! – 1969 film by Richard Fleischer in which Argentine revolutionary Ernesto "Che" Guevara (Omar Sharif) meets his death in Bolivia in 1967
 The Royal Hunt of the Sun – 1969 film by Irving Lerner, based on the play by Peter Shaffer, in which Inca Emperor Atahualpa (Christopher Plummer) meets his end in 1533 at the hands of Spanish conquistador Francisco Pizarro (Robert Shaw)
 The Price of Power – 1969 spaghetti Western by Tonino Valerii depicting the assassination of President Garfield (Van Johnson) by a disappointed office seeker in 1881, fictionalized in the manner of the 1963 Kennedy assassination
 Z – Oscar-winning 1969 Algerian film by Costa-Gavras in which a magistrate struggles to prosecute the assassins of an opposition politician (Yves Montand), based on the 1963 murder of Greek MP Gregoris Lambrakis
 Oikeamieliset – 1969 Finnish television film by Veikko Kerttula about the assassin (Esko Salminen) of Russian Grand Duke Sergei in 1905, based on the play Les Justes by Nobel laureate Albert Camus
 Crossplot – 1969 film by Alvin Rakoff where an executive (Roger Moore) learns of a plot to assassinate a visiting African leader in London
 The Assassination Bureau – 1969 romp by Basil Dearden, set in Edwardian Europe, in which a journalist (Diana Rigg) hires an assassination agency to kill the head of the agency itself (Oliver Reed), inspired by the much more serious novel by Jack London
 Burn! – 1969 film by Gillo Pontecorvo in which the revolutionary activities of a British agent (Marlon Brando) on a Portuguese colonial island lead to assassination

1970s

1970–1974
 Julius Caesar – 1970 film by Stuart Burge about the assassination of Julius Caesar (John Gielgud) in the Roman Senate on the Ides of March, 44 BC, adapted from Shakespeare's tragedy
 Little Big Man – 1970 revisionist Western by Arthur Penn, about a settler raised by Cheyenne Indians (Dustin Hoffman), includes the assassination of lawman Wild Bill Hickok in 1876
 Consigna: matar al comandante en jefe (Assignment: Killing the Commander in Chief) – 1970 Spanish-Italian film by José Luis Merino where an attack on German Gen. Rommel (Piero Lulli) fails, but the Germans use the idea of a captured Rommel in their plan to assassinate Gen. Eisenhower
 The Conformist – 1970 film by Bernardo Bertolucci about a fascist assassin sent from Italy to assassinate his former professor in Paris.
 Nicholas and Alexandra – 1971 film by Franklin J. Schaffner where the assassinations of Pyotr Stolypin, Franz Ferdinand, and Rasputin precede the 1918 executions of Russian Tsar Nicholas II and his consort, Tsarina Alexandra
 They've Killed President Lincoln – 1971 television film by Robert Guenette
 Mihai Viteazul – 1971 Romanian film by Sergiu Nicolaescu, set during the Long War, about Prince Michael the Brave, ending with his 1601 murder by his ally, Habsburg general Giorgio Basta
 The Devils – 1971 film by Ken Russell about Urbain Grandier (Oliver Reed), a French priest opposed to Cardinal Richelieu, who is burnt at the stake in 1634 for witchcraft
 Get Carter – 1971 film by Mike Hodges where a London gangster (Michael Caine) in Newcastle avenges his brother's death before an assassin finds him – not the 2000 remake with Sylvester Stallone and a different ending
 Diamonds Are Forever – 1971 film by Guy Hamilton that opens with James Bond on a vendetta-driven assassination run against Ernst Stavro Blofeld
 The Assassination of Trotsky – 1972 film by Joseph Losey about the murder of Leon Trotsky (Richard Burton) by the mysterious "Jacson" (Alain Delon) in Mexico City in 1940
 Karl Liebknecht – Trotz alledem! – 1972 East German film by Günter Reisch in which Karl Liebknecht and Rosa Luxemburg, Spartacist League leaders, are murdered by Berlin Freikorps in 1919
 Sarajevski atentat – 1972 Yugoslavian (Serbo-Croatian) television film by Arsenije Jovanović about the 1914 plot to assassinate Austrian Archduke Franz Ferdinand by a Young Bosnia nationalist (Milan Mihailović) and his co-conspirators
 Les Thibault – 1972 French ORTF miniseries by Alain Boudet and André Michel includes the assassination of Socialist leader and pacifist Jean Jaurès in 1914
 State of Siege – 1972 French film by Costa-Gavras about the execution of a U.S. government torturer (Yves Montand) in Uruguay by Tupamaro guerrillas, based on the 1970 Dan Mitrione case
 Pope Joan – 1972 film by Michael Anderson about the lynching of Pope Joan (Liv Ullmann), the legendary female English Pope, when her sex is discovered
 The Godfather – 1972 film by Francis Ford Coppola, based on the novel by Mario Puzo, in which the attempted assassination of a Mafia don (Marlon Brando) leads to retaliation and further assassinations among Mafia families
 The Mechanic – 1972 film by Michael Winner about a hitman (Charles Bronson) and his protégé (Jan-Michael Vincent)
 Il delitto Matteotti – 1973 Italian film by Florestano Vancini about the assassination of Socialist leader Giacomo Matteotti (Franco Nero) in 1924 by the Ceka of Prime Minister Mussolini, who maintains the support of King Victor Emmanuel and strengthens his dictatorship
 The Day of the Jackal – 1973 film adaptation by Fred Zinnemann of the novel by Frederick Forsyth, where the assassin of Patrice Lumumba and Rafael Trujillo is assigned to kill Charles de Gaulle
 Executive Action – 1973 film by David Miller details a presumed conspiracy to assassinate John F. Kennedy, based on a 1966 bestseller by Mark Lane and subsequent 1967 documentary by Emile de Antonio
 Love and Anarchy – 1973 Italian film by Lina Wertmüller about a 1930s anarchist (Giancarlo Giannini) who prepares to assassinate Mussolini over the murder of a friend
 The Day of the Dolphin – 1973 science fiction film by Mike Nichols in which talking bottlenose dolphins are used in a plot to mine the U.S. President's yacht
 Sleeper – Hugo-winning 1973 science fiction comedy by Woody Allen, set in the year 2173, when rebels have killed a dictator, and a defrosted health food store owner from 1973 (Allen) is sent to assassinate the dictator's only surviving part, his nose, before it can be cloned
 Theatre of Blood – 1973 film by Douglas Hickox in which an overacting Shakespearean actor (Vincent Price) assassinates his critics in the manner of Shakespeare's most grotesque murder scenes
 Scorpio – 1973 film by Michael Winner about a French assassin (Alain Delon) engaged by the CIA
 The Werewolf of Washington – 1973 horror satire by Milton Moses Ginsberg raises the question whether party loyalty is enough to protect the U.S. President when he hires a werewolf (Dean Stockwell) as his press secretary
 Live and Let Die – 1973 film by Guy Hamilton that opens with the assassinations of several British agents on the orders of Dr. Kananga (Yaphet Kotto), ruler of the fictional country of San Monique, later killed by James Bond (Roger Moore) – the first time 007 is shown assassinating the leader of a country
 Fall of Eagles – 1974 BBC miniseries by Bill Hays, David Cunliffe, et al. includes the assassinations of Vyacheslav von Plehve († 1904), Grand Duke Sergei († 1905) and Archduke Franz Ferdinand († 1914), but omits Tsars Alexander II († 1881) and Nicholas II († 1918), and "Sissi", Queen Empress of Austro-Hungary († 1898)
 Gustav III – 1974 Swedish television film by Johan Bergenstråhle about the 1792 shooting of King Gustav III (Gösta Ekman) by a disgruntled officer (Håkan Serner) at a masquerade ball
 Orders (Les Ordres) – Oscar-submitted 1974 French Canadian film by Michel Brault about mass arrests following the assassination of Quebec Labour Minister Pierre Laporte by FLQ terrorists during the 1970 October Crisis
 Agony: The Life and Death of Rasputin (Агония) – 1974 Soviet film by Elem Klimov about the murdered monk, Rasputin
 La Muerte de Pancho Villa – 1974 Mexican film by Mario Hernández about the assassination of Pancho Villa in 1923
 Peregrina – 1974 Mexican film by Mario Hernández about the assassination of Yucatán Governor Felipe Carrillo Puerto in 1924
 The ODESSA File – 1974 film by Ronald Neame in which a West German journalist (Jon Voight) targets Edward Roschmann, industrialist and former SS commandant of Riga concentration camp
 The Parallax View – 1974 film by Alan J. Pakula about a reporter and assassination conspiracy theorist (Warren Beatty), and the murders of two U.S. senators, adapted from the novel by Loren Singer
 The Godfather Part II – 1974 film, the second part of the Godfather trilogy, written by Mario Puzo and Francis Ford Coppola, and directed by Coppola; is ranked among the greatest films of all time
 A Boy and His Dog – 1974 science fiction film by L. Q. Jones about a teenage girl who recruits a post-apocalyptic nomad (Don Johnson) to assassinate her town council as part of a coup
 The Man with the Golden Gun – 1974 film by Guy Hamilton that pits James Bond against the world's top assassin, Scaramanga (Christopher Lee)

1975–1979
 Operation: Daybreak – 1975 film by Lewis Gilbert about the assassination of Nazi Reinhard Heydrich by Czech commandos in 1942, starring Timothy Bottoms
 Sarajevski atentat (a.k.a. The Day That Shook the World) – Oscar-submitted 1975 Yugoslavian-Czechoslovakian (Serbo-Croatian) film by Veljko Bulajić about the 1914 assassination of Austrian Archduke Franz Ferdinand (Christopher Plummer) and his wife by a Young Bosnia nationalist (Irfan Mensur)

 L'Attentat de Damiens – 1975 French television film by Pierre Cavassilas about the assassination attempt made against King Louis XV by Robert-François Damiens in 1757
 Edward the Seventh – 1975 ITV miniseries by John Gorrie about Edward VII includes his attempted assassination by a teenaged anarchist in Brussels in 1900, as well as the off-screen assassination of Tsar Alexander II in 1881. The assassination of a daughter of Alexander Izvolsky is mentioned.
 Assassination in Davos – Oscar-submitted 1975 Swiss film by Rolf Lyssy about the assassination of Swiss Nazi leader Wilhelm Gustloff in 1936
 Hennessy – 1975 film by Don Sharp about an Irishman's plot to blow up Parliament in London
 Love and Death – 1975 satire by Woody Allen, set during the 1812 French invasion of Russia, in which a coward (Allen) and his wife (Diane Keaton) decide to assassinate Emperor Napoleon Bonaparte
 The Eiger Sanction – 1975 thriller by Clint Eastwood in which a professor and reluctant assassin (Eastwood) must determine his target on a mountainside in the midst of a climbing expedition, from the novel by Trevanian
 Linda Lovelace for President – 1975 film by Claudio Guzmán where pornographic film actress Linda Lovelace (as herself) tries to screw her way to the U.S. Presidency, but becomes the target of her opponents' "Assassinator"
 Three Days of the Condor – 1975 film by Sydney Pollack about assassins working for an unauthorized Black ops program who target a lone CIA analyst (Robert Redford) after wiping out his entire division
 The Last of Mrs. Lincoln – 1976 television film by George Schaefer about the aftermath of the 1865 Lincoln assassination
 Il pleut sur Santiago – 1976 French film by Helvio Soto about the CIA-backed coup against Chilean President Salvador Allende in 1973
 All the President's Men – 1976 film by Alan J. Pakula, about the exposure of the Watergate scandal, mentions Arthur Bremer's 1972 assassination attempt against candidate George Wallace as well as threats in his diary directed against Pres. Nixon
 I, Claudius – 1976 BBC miniseries by Herbert Wise on political violence in ancient Rome, involving the murders of members of the Imperial family – Marcellus, Agrippa, Gaius, Lucius, the Emperor Augustus (poisoned by his wife Livia), Postumus, Germanicus, "Castor", "Helen", Drusus and Nero, Livilla, the Emperor Tiberius, Gemellus, Drusilla and fœtus, the Emperor Caligula (John Hurt), Caesonia and Julia Drusilla, Messalina, the Emperor Claudius (Derek Jacobi), Britannicus, Agrippinilla – and others
 Eleanor and Franklin – 1976 ABC miniseries by Daniel Petrie covers the period of the 1933 attempted assassination of President-elect Franklin D. Roosevelt by a delusional anarchist
 Rogue Male – 1976 BBC television film by Clive Donner, starring Peter O'Toole and Alastair Sim, based on Geoffrey Household's 1939 novel, Rogue Male.
 The Eagle Has Landed – 1976 film by John Sturges about a German plot, initially, to capture Winston Churchill
 Taxi Driver – Palme d'Or-winning 1976 film by Martin Scorsese in which a confused loner (Robert De Niro) tries to assassinate a U.S. Senator and presidential candidate
 Helter Skelter – 1976 television film by Tom Gries, starring Steve Railsback, about the Charles Manson Family murders, the Family including Squeaky Fromme, would-be 1975 assassin of President Ford
 The Next Man – 1976 film by Richard C. Sarafian in which a Saudi minister (Sean Connery) who wants peace with Israel faces a series of assassination attempts from terrorists
 Target of an Assassin (a.k.a. Fatal Assassin) – 1976 film by Peter Collinson in which a South African male nurse (Anthony Quinn) kidnaps the hospitalized target of a failed assassination, a visiting African President

 Śmierć prezydenta (Death of a President) – 1977 Polish film by Jerzy Kawalerowicz about the 1922 assassination of Polish President Gabriel Narutowicz (Zdzisław Mrożewski)
 The Life and Assassination of the Kingfish – 1977 television film by Robert E. Collins about the 1935 assassination of Louisiana governor Huey Long (Edward Asner)
 The Lincoln Conspiracy – 1977 television film by James L. Conway that details a presumed conspiracy of Radical Republicans, led by Secretary of War Stanton (Robert Middleton), to assassinate President Lincoln (John Anderson) in 1865
 The Trial of Lee Harvey Oswald – 1977 TV miniseries by Gordon Davidson and David Greene in which the accused assassin (John Pleshette) of U.S. President Kennedy is placed on trial in Texas before his own assassination by Jack Ruby
 Black Sunday – 1977 film by John Frankenheimer about a terrorist plot to detonate a blimp bomb over the Super Bowl football game with the U.S. President in attendance
 The Strange Case of the End of Civilization as We Know It – 1977 comedy by Joseph McGrath which involves "Sherlock Holmes" (John Cleese) in the murders of the U.S. Secretary of State and various police officials
 The Spy Who Loved Me – 1977 James Bond film by Lewis Gilbert that features the debut of a steel-toothed assassin named Jaws
 King – 1978 NBC miniseries by Abby Mann depicts the 1965 murder of civil rights worker Viola Liuzzo, as well as the 1958 near fatal stabbing, by a deranged woman, and 1968 assassination of Martin Luther King Jr. (Paul Winfield)
 Coronel Delmiro Gouveia – 1978 Brazilian film by Geraldo Sarno about industrialist Delmiro Gouveia, reputedly killed in 1917 for failing to sell out to British business interests
 El Cantor – 1978 East German television film by Dean Reed about Chilean folksinger Víctor Jara (Reed), murdered after the 1973 overthrow of Salvador Allende
 Brass Target – 1978 film by John Hough about a plan in 1945 to assassinate Gen. Patton over his investigation of a theft of Reichsbank gold by U.S. Army officers
 Ruby and Oswald—1978 TV film which has Lee Harvey Oswald (Frederic Forrest) assassinate U.S. President Kennedy.
 Foul Play – 1978 comedy-thriller by Colin Higgins involving a plot to assassinate the Pope in San Francisco, starring Chevy Chase and Goldie Hawn.
 Who Is Killing the Great Chefs of Europe? – 1978 comedy by Ted Kotcheff, starring George Segal, in which European gourmet chefs are being served up like their greatest dishes
 Operación Ogro – 1979 Spanish film by Gillo Pontecorvo about the operation of the same name, targeting Luis Carrero Blanco, Franco's Prime Minister, by ETA bombers in 1973
 22 June 1897 – 1979 Indian (Marathi) film by Jayoo Patwardhan and Nachiket Patwardhan about the 1897 assassinations of plague-control officers, Charles Walter Rand and Charles Egerton Ayerst, in British India
 Roots: The Next Generations – 1979 ABC miniseries, by John Erman et al., based on the book by Alex Haley, includes the assassination of black nationalist Malcolm X (Al Freeman, Jr.) and features an interview with a figure later assassinated, American Nazi leader George Lincoln Rockwell (Marlon Brando)
 Caligula – controversial 1979 film produced by Bob Guccione about the assassination of insane Roman Emperor Caligula (Malcolm McDowell) and his immediate family in AD 41
 Steiner – Das eiserne Kreuz, 2. Teil (Steiner – The Iron Cross, Part 2, a.k.a. Breakthrough) – 1979 sequel by Andrew V. McLaglen in which German Army Sgt. Steiner from Cross of Iron (Richard Burton) becomes involved in a plot against Hitler
 I as in Icarus – 1979 French film by Henri Verneuil where a committee in a fictitious country, after their President's assassination, settles on a lone gunman, but a single investigator (Yves Montand) is dissatisfied
 Apocalypse Now – Palme d'Or-winning 1979 film by Francis Ford Coppola, set during the Vietnam War, loosely inspired by Joseph Conrad's Heart of Darkness, and starring Marlon Brando and Martin Sheen.  Sheen's character is sent to assassinate Brando's.
 Winter Kills – 1979 film adapted from the novel by Richard Condon.

1980s

1980–1984
 Jean Jaurès: vie et mort d'un socialiste – 1980 French television film by Ange Casta about the assassination of Socialist leader and pacifist Jean Jaurès in 1914
 Guyana Tragedy: The Story of Jim Jones – 1980 television film by William A. Graham about the murder of Congressman Leo Ryan by cult leader Jim Jones prior to the mass suicide in 1978
 Judita – 1980 Yugoslavian (Croatian) television film by Marin Carić on the beheading of Assyrian general Holofernes by Biblical heroine Judith (Dubravka Miletić), based on the Book of Judith and the 1521 Croatian nationalist epic poem by Marko Marulić
 The Ordeal of Dr. Mudd – 1980 television film by Paul Wendkos about the imprisonment of Dr. Samuel Mudd (Dennis Weaver), following the Lincoln assassination in 1865
 The Blood of Hussain – 1980 Pakistani (Urdu) film by Jamil Dehlavi about the martyrdom of Imam Hussain in A.D. 680 (61 A.H.)
 Tom Horn – 1980 Western by William Wiard about Tom Horn (Steve McQueen), a gun for hire in 1890s Wyoming
 The Dogs of War – 1980 film by John Irvin in which a mercenary (Christopher Walken) plans to kill a fictional African dictator in the course of a coup d'état
 The Kidnapping of the President – 1980 film by George Mendeluk in which the U.S. President (Hal Holbrook) is kidnapped by a South American terrorist and sealed in an armoured car wired to explode
 Cuba Crossing (a.k.a. Assignment: Kill Castro) – 1980 film by Chuck Workman involving a plot against Fidel Castro
 Death of a Prophet – 1981 film by Woodie King Jr. about the 1965 assassination of black nationalist Malcolm X (Morgan Freeman)
 Die Gerechten – 1981 West German television film by Frank Guthke about the assassin (Jan Niklas) of Russian Grand Duke Sergei in 1905, based on the play Les Justes by Nobel laureate Albert Camus – also, earlier West German versions in 1964 with Christoph Bantzer, and 1959 with Pinkas Braun
 Rise and Fall of Idi Amin – 1981 film by Sharad Patel in which Ugandan President Idi Amin (Joseph Olita) eliminates those he dislikes
 Teheran 43 – 1981 Franco-Soviet film by Aleksandr Alov and Vladimir Naumov about a German plot to assassinate Churchill, Roosevelt and Stalin as they attend the Tehran Conference in 1943
 Escape from New York – 1981 science fiction film by John Carpenter, set at the end of World War III, in which the inmates of the prison island of Manhattan threaten their hostage, the mutilated U.S. President (Donald Pleasence), with death
 Blow Out – 1981 film directed by Brian De Palma about a sound engineer (John Travolta) who is earwitness to a political assassination
 The Amateur – 1981 film by Charles Jarrott about a CIA cryptographer (John Savage) who trains as an assassin after the terrorist death of his fiancée
 Gandhi – 1982 film by Richard Attenborough about Mahatma Gandhi (Ben Kingsley) and his 1948 assassination by a Hindu extremist
 The Blue and the Gray – 1982 CBS miniseries by Andrew V. McLaglen includes the death of U.S. President Lincoln (Gregory Peck) in 1865
 Missing – Palme d'Or-winning 1982 film by Costa-Gavras about the CIA-backed coup against Chilean President Salvador Allende in 1973, and the disappearance of a U.S. journalist, based on Charles Horman
 La passante du Sans-Souci – 1982 French film by Jacques Rouffio in which a humanitarian (Michel Piccoli) kills the ambassador of Paraguay, a former Nazi
 Harry's Game – 1982 ITV miniseries by Lawrence Gordon Clark in which a British soldier (Ray Lonnen) goes undercover in Belfast to track down the IRA assassin of a cabinet minister
 Under Fire – 1983 film by Roger Spottiswoode about the Somoza regime in 1979 Nicaragua, involving the assassination of a rebel leader
 For Us the Living: The Medgar Evers Story – 1983 television film by Michael Schulz about assassinated civil rights leader Medgar Evers
 Sadat – 1983 CBS miniseries by Richard Michaels about Egyptian President and Nobel laureate Anwar Sadat (Louis Gossett), assassinated along with other dignitaries in 1981 by Islamic extremists
 Karadjordjeva smrt (Карађорђева смрт) – 1983 Yugoslavian (Serbo-Croatian) television film by Đorđe Kadijević about the 1817 assassination of Karadjordje Petrović, leader of the First Serbian Uprising against the Ottomans, by agents of Prince Miloš Obrenović
 Reilly, Ace of Spies – 1983 ITV miniseries by Jim Goddard and Martin Campbell about a plot against Lenin involving British spy Sidney Reilly (Sam Neill), executed by the OGPU in 1925, and a model for Ian Fleming's spy James Bond
 Al-Mas' Ala Al-Kubra (a.k.a. Clash of Loyalties) – 1983 Iraqi film by Mohamed Shukri Jameel about the murder of British military governor Gerard Leachman (Oliver Reed) near Fallujah in 1920
 Silkwood – 1983 film by Mike Nichols about the mysterious 1974 death of Karen Silkwood (Meryl Streep), a whistleblowing nuclear plant employee
 Jaane Bhi Do Yaaro – 1983 Indian (Hindi) film directed by Kundan Shah, a dark satirical comedy involving the assassination of a mayor.
 Taking Tiger Mountain – 1983 science fiction film by Tom Huckabee in which feminist scientists send a transgender agent (Bill Paxton, unconfirmed) to kill the Welsh Minister of Prostitution
 Never Say Never Again – 1983 film by Irvin Kershner in which James Bond (Sean Connery) faces a female SPECTRE assassin
 Willem van Oranje – 1984 Dutch-Belgian AVRO/BRT miniseries by Walter van der Kamp, about William of Orange (Jasper Krabbé, Jeroen Krabbé) leading the Dutch Revolt, includes his 1584 assassination, by pistol, by a French Catholic bounty hunter (Sjoerd Pleijsier)
 Down on Us – 1984 film by Larry Buchanan which argues that Jimi Hendrix (Gregory Allen Chatman), Jim Morrison, and Janis Joplin were assassinated by the U.S. government
 The Ambassador – 1984 film by J. Lee Thompson in which the U.S. ambassador to Israel (Robert Mitchum) is saved from assassination by his security chief (Rock Hudson)
 Protocol – 1984 comedy by Herbert Ross where the assassination of an Arab emir is stopped by a waitress (Goldie Hawn)
 The Glory Boys – 1984 television film by Michael Ferguson in which the IRA aids a PLO terrorist in a hit on an Israeli nuclear scientist
 Dune – 1984 science fiction film by David Lynch in which Duke Leto (Jürgen Prochnow) fails in his attempt to assassinate Baron Harkonnen on the planet Arrakis

1985–1989
 Hitler's SS: Portrait in Evil – 1985 television film by Jim Goddard about Nazi Germany, including the Night of the Long Knives in 1934
 Dawn – 1985 film by Miklós Jancsó about the murder of a British officer (Michael York) by Zionist terrorists, based on the novel by Nobel laureate Elie Wiesel
 Rosa Luxemburg – 1986 West German film by Margarethe von Trotta in which Karl Liebknecht and Rosa Luxemburg, Spartacist League leaders, are murdered by Berlin Freikorps in 1919
 Lady Jane – 1986 film by Trevor Nunn about the execution of English queen Lady Jane Grey (Helena Bonham Carter) in 1554
 Attentato al Papa – 1986 Italian television film by Giuseppe Fina in which Pope John Paul survives an assassination attempt by a Turkish assassin in 1981
 Dragon rapide – 1986 Spanish film by Jaime Camino about the events leading to the outbreak of the Spanish Civil War in 1936, including the assassination of rightist politician José Calvo Sotelo (José Luis Pellicena) by Socialists
 Shaka Zulu – 1986 SABC miniseries and 1987 film by William C. Faure about the murder of Zulu king Shaka by his brothers at Dukuza in 1828
 Night of the Pencils – 1986 Argentine film by Héctor Olivera about a group of student activists tortured then killed over the cost of bus fare, in 1976 during the Dirty War period
 Sword of Gideon – 1986 CTV miniseries by Michael Anderson about the hunt for those purportedly involved in the 1972 Munich massacre
 North and South, Book II – 1986 miniseries by Kevin Connor includes a fictional 1864 plot to overthrow and kill President Jefferson Davis of the Confederate States of America
 The Assault – Oscar-winning 1986 Dutch film by Fons Rademakers about the consequences for an average family after the assassination of a Nazi collaborator, based on the novel by Harry Mulisch
 Cry Freedom – 1987 film by Richard Attenborough about the murder of South African activist Steve Biko in 1977
 Vuk Karadžić (Вук Караџић) – 1987 Yugoslavian (Serbo-Croatian) RTB miniseries by Đorđe Kadijević about Vuk Karadžić, the Serbian language reformer, includes several assassinations, the Slaughter of the Dukes in 1804, Vožd Karadjordje Petrović in 1817, and Prince Mihailo Obrenović in 1868
 Matewan – 1987 film by John Sayles where labour unrest in West Virginia builds to the 1920 Battle of Matewan, with the death of mayor Cabell Testerman, and the 1921 assassination of police chief Sid Hatfield (David Strathairn)
 Aria – 1987 film by Nicolas Roeg in which Albanian King Zog (Theresa Russell with a moustache) survives an assassination attempt in 1931
 Assassination – 1987 film by Peter R. Hunt about a Secret Service agent (Charles Bronson) who must defend the obnoxious wife (Jill Ireland) of the about-to-be-inaugurated U.S. President
 Hour of the Assassin – 1987 film by Luis Llosa in which a man (Erik Estrada) is tricked into trying to assassinate a newly elected Latin American president
 Jäähyväiset presidentille (Farewell, Mr. President) – 1987 Finnish film by Matti Kassila about a tall poppy syndromed waiter (Hannu Lauri) who plans to assassinate the President of Finland
 The Living Daylights – 1987 film by John Glen in which James Bond is assigned to kill an enemy sniper assassin

 To Kill a Priest – 1988 film by Agnieszka Holland where a Polish secret policeman (Ed Harris) is sent to kill an outspoken priest (Christopher Lambert), based on the 1984 assassination of Jerzy Popiełuszko
 Mississippi Burning – 1988 film by Alan Parker about the murders of Chaney, Goodman, and Schwerner in 1964, starring Gene Hackman
 Talk Radio – 1988 film by Oliver Stone about a provocative, "shock jock" radio host (Eric Bogosian) goading his audience to violence, inspired by the murder of Denver broadcaster Alan Berg in 1984
 Betrayed – 1988 film by Costa-Gavras about an FBI investigation into white supremacists after the death of a Jewish radio host, inspired by the murder of Denver broadcaster Alan Berg in 1984
 De hvite bussene (Those White Buses) – 1988 Norwegian television film commemorates Swedish diplomat and humanitarian Count Folke Bernadotte but does not depict his 1948 assassination by Zionist terrorists
 The Murder of Mary Phagan – 1988 NBC miniseries by William Hale about the lynching of Jewish factory owner Leo Frank (Peter Gallagher) in 1915
 A Dangerous Life – 1988 HBO miniseries by Robert Markowitz, starring Gary Busey, about how the assassination of Benigno Aquino in Manila in 1983 led finally to the downfall of Philippine President Ferdinand Marcos
 A World Apart – 1988 film by Chris Menges commemorates a South African anti-apartheid activist (Barbara Hershey) based on Ruth First, assassinated by mail bomb in 1982
 Gorillas in the Mist – 1988 film by Michael Apted in which the mock execution of a poacher precedes the murder of U.S. primatologist Dian Fossey (Sigourney Weaver), in Rwanda in 1985
 The Naked Gun – 1988 comedy by David Zucker about a plot to have baseball legend Reggie Jackson assassinate Queen Elizabeth II (Jeannette Charles)
 Romero – 1989 film by John Duigan about the murders of Salvadoran priest Rutilio Grande in 1977, then Archbishop Óscar Romero (Raúl Juliá) in 1980
 Rojo amanecer (a.k.a. Red Dawn) – 1989 Mexican film by Jorge Fons about the 1968 Tlatelolco massacre of student activists by President Díaz Ordaz
 The Revenge of Al Capone – 1989 television film by Michael Pressman in which mobster Al Capone (Ray Sharkey) plans the assassination of Chicago Mayor Cermak, based on a revisionist interpretation of the 1933 attempted murder of President-elect Roosevelt by a delusional anarchist
 Red Scorpion – 1989 film by Joseph Zito, scripted by convicted criminal Jack Abramoff, about a KGB agent sent to kill an African anti-Communist rebel leader, inspired by Angola's Jonas Savimbi
 Terroristit – 1989 Finnish television film by Veli-Matti Saikkonen about a terrorist (Ville Sandqvist), based on the play Les Justes by Nobel laureate Albert Camus
 Esh Tzolevet – 1989 Israeli film by Gideon Ganani about the assassination of a British Army officer in Palestine
 Licence to Kill – 1989 film by John Glen in which James Bond goes rogue and plans the assassination of a drug dealer who maimed a close friend

1990s

1990–1994
 The Plot to Kill Hitler – 1990 film by Lawrence Schiller about the Stauffenberg plot against Adolf Hitler, starring Brad Davis
 Murder in Mississippi – 1990 television film by Roger Young about the murders of Chaney, Goodman, and Schwerner in 1964, starring Tom Hulce
 Sandino – 1990 film by Chilean director Miguel Littín about Nicaraguan revolutionary Augusto Sandino (Joaquim de Almeida), assassinated by future dictator Anastasio Somoza García in 1934
 A Show of Force – 1990 film by Bruno Barreto about the assassination of two Puerto Rican nationalists by FBI agents, aided by a local agent provocateur (Lou Diamond Phillips), based on the 1978 Cerro Maravilla Incident
 Drug Wars: The Camarena Story – 1990 NBC miniseries by Brian Gibson about U.S. DEA agent Enrique Camarena, murdered in Guadalajara, Mexico in 1985
 International Gorillay (a.k.a. International Guerillas ) – 1990 Pakistani (Urdu) film by Jan Mohammed in which three brothers plan to assassinate British novelist and "Israeli agent"  Salman Rushdie over his book The Satanic Verses
 Captain America – 1990 science fiction film by Albert Pyun in which the Red Skull, who failed to kill President Franklin D. Roosevelt during World War II, but succeeded in assassinating John F. Kennedy, Martin Luther King Jr. and Robert F. Kennedy, now targets the newly elected U.S. president (Ronny Cox)
 Running Against Time – 1990 science fiction film by Bruce Seth Green where a time-travelling history professor (Robert Hays) tries to prevent the 1963 assassination of President Kennedy and avert the Vietnam War
 La Femme Nikita – 1990 French film directed by Luc Besson concerning Nikita, who is convicted of murder. In prison, she is injected with drugs, simulating death. Officially dead, she is given the choice of either working for the DGSE as an assassin or being killed for real
 The Godfather Part III – 1990 film, the final part of the Godfather trilogy, written by Mario Puzo and Francis Ford Coppola, and directed by Coppola
 Fatal Mission – 1990 film by George Rowe in which a CIA agent (Peter Fonda) plays the role of reporter in order to assassinate a North Vietnamese general
 JFK – 1991 film by Oliver Stone about a grand conspiracy to implicate Lee Harvey Oswald (Gary Oldman) as the assassin of President Kennedy
 Edward II – 1991 film by Derek Jarman about the murder of English King Edward II in 1327
 Year of the Gun – 1991 film by John Frankenheimer about the death of former Italian Prime Minister Aldo Moro in 1978
 Der 13. Tag – 1991 Austrian film about the Communist takeover of Czechoslovakia in 1948 and the mysterious death of Foreign Minister Jan Masaryk
 Darrow – 1991 television film by John David Coles where attorney Clarence Darrow (Kevin Spacey) defends the delusional newsboy (Paul Klementowicz) who murdered Chicago Mayor Carter Harrison, Sr. in 1893
 Bugsy – 1991 film by Barry Levinson, starring Warren Beatty, where mobster Bugsy Siegel, heavily romanticized, gets whacked in 1947
 In Broad Daylight – 1991 television film by James Steven Sadwith in which a brutal town bully (Brian Dennehy) is finally murdered by frightened townspeople, based on the 1981 Ken McElroy case
 The Assassin of the Tsar (Цареубийца) – 1991 Russian film by Karen Shakhnazarov about a mental patient (Малколм МакДауэлл / Malcolm McDowell) who believes himself to have been the assassin of both Tsar Alexander II and Tsar Nicholas II
 The Pope Must Die (a.k.a. The Pope Must Die(t)) – 1991 comedy by Peter Richardson where an honest Pope, one not controlled by the Mafia, is accidentally elected, so he (Robbie Coltrane) must be eliminated
 The Last Boy Scout – 1991 film by Tony Scott about a former Secret Service agent (Bruce Willis), saviour of Pres. Carter, foils a plot against a U.S. Senator
 Star Trek VI: The Undiscovered Country – 1991 science fiction film by Nicholas Meyer in which Captain Kirk is falsely accused of assassinating the Klingon chancellor.
 Stalin – 1992 television film by Ivan Passer in which Joseph Stalin (Robert Duvall) eliminates former friends and associates like Sergei Kirov, Grigory Zinoviev, Lev Kamenev, Nikolai Bukharin, Genrikh Yagoda, Nikolai Yezhov, and Leon Trotsky during the Great Purge
 Malcolm X – 1992 film by Spike Lee about black nationalist Malcolm X (Denzel Washington), involving his father's suspicious death in 1931 and his own assassination in 1965
 Ruby – 1992 film by John Mackenzie about Dallas nightclub owner Jack Ruby (Danny Aiello), the killer of the presumed assassin of John F. Kennedy
 Chekist (Чекист) – 1992 Russian film by Aleksandr Rogozhkin about a secret policeman in Lenin's Cheka who eliminates perceived opponents of the Bolshevik Revolution
 Crisis in the Kremlin – 1992 film by Jonathan Winfrey in which a CIA agent (Robert Rusler) must protect Mikhail Gorbachev from assassination
 Devlin – 1992 television film by Rick Rosenthal where a New York mayoral candidate is murdered and a detective (Bryan Brown) is suspected, while the actual killer is murdered in a chain of assassinations
 Bob Roberts – 1992 satire by Tim Robbins about a corrupt Senatorial candidate (Robbins) who organizes his own phoney assassination and subsequent simulated paralysis
 Black Cat 2: Assassination of President Yeltsin – 1992 Hong Kong sequel by Stephen Shin about a CIA assassin (Jade Leung) who pursues the killers of a Russian President coincidentally named "Boris Yeltsin"
 El Mariachi – 1992 U.S. (Spanish) film by Robert Rodriguez about an unemployed musician in Mexico who is targeted by hitmen
 In the Line of Fire – 1993 film by Wolfgang Petersen about an attempted assassination of an American president; Clint Eastwood plays a Secret Service agent who had been in the detail guarding President Kennedy in Dallas on 22 November 1963.
 Once Upon a Time in China III – 1993 Hong Kong film by Tsui Hark in which martial artist Wong Fei Hung (Jet Li) helps to foil the assassination of Viceroy Li Hung-chang by a Russian diplomat
 Sniper – 1993 film by Luis Llosa about a U.S. Marine sniper (Tom Berenger) targeting a drug lord in Panama
 Point of No Return – 1993 film directed by John Badham, also known as The Assassin; a remake of Nikita.
 Octobre – 1994 French Canadian film by Pierre Falardeau about the assassination of Quebec Labour Minister Pierre Laporte by FLQ terrorists during the 1970 October Crisis
 Doomsday Gun – 1994 television film by Robert Young about the assassination of Canadian long-range artillery expert Gerald Bull (Frank Langella) in 1990
 Bandit Queen – 1994 Indian (Hindi) film by Shekhar Kapur about outlaw Phoolan Devi, who was assassinated later, in 2001, in revenge for a past crime
 47 Ronin – 1994 Japanese film by Kon Ichikawa about the Forty-seven Ronin, a group of samurai who plotted to avenge their lord's death in 1701
 Barcelona – 1994 comedy by Whit Stillman includes an assassination attempt on a U.S. Navy officer (Chris Eigeman) by Spanish nationalists
 Al-irhabi – 1994 Egyptian comedy by Nader Galal in which a fleeing Islamic fundamentalist assassin (Adel Imam) is cared for by a family following a road accident
 Léon: The Professional – 1994 film by Luc Besson about a hitman (Jean Reno) who defends a young girl (Natalie Portman) from corrupt DEA agents

1995–1999
 The End of the Obrenović Dynasty (Крај династије Обреновић) – 1995 Yugoslavian (Serbo-Croatian) RTB miniseries by Sava Mrmak about the assassinations of Serbian King Alexander I, his consort, Queen Draga, Prime Minister Cincar-Marković, and others, in 1903
 Kingfish: A Story of Huey P. Long – 1995 television film by Thomas Schlamme about the 1935 assassination of Louisiana governor Huey Long (John Goodman)
 Nixon – 1995 film by Oliver Stone in which Pres. Nixon discusses U.S. government-sponsored assassination attempts directed at Fidel Castro – the corresponding imagery, but not dialogue, also includes Patrice Lumumba († 1961) and Salvador Allende († 1974) – later, Nixon and his aides fantasize about assassinating Daniel Ellsberg (over The Pentagon Papers)
 Wild Bill – 1995 revisionist Western by Walter Hill about the assassination of lawman Wild Bill Hickok (Jeff Bridges) in 1876
 The Shooter – 1995 film by Ted Kotcheff where, after the murder of the Cuban ambassador to the U.N., a CIA agent (Dolph Lundgren) must prevent the lesbian assassin (Maruschka Detmers) from disrupting a U.S.–Cuba summit
 Assassins – 1995 film by Richard Donner about the rivalry between a seasoned hitman (Sylvester Stallone) and an upstart (Antonio Banderas)
 GoldenEye – 1995 film by Martin Campbell that features a female assassin (Famke Janssen) and pits James Bond against a fellow agent gone rogue
 Atentat (Assassination) – 1995 Ukrainian film by Oles Yanchuk
 Ghosts of Mississippi – 1996 film by Rob Reiner about the trial of the assassin of civil rights leader Medgar Evers
 I Shot Andy Warhol – 1996 film by Mary Harron about the 1968 shooting of artist Andy Warhol (Jared Harris) by a disturbed writer (Lili Taylor)
 On Dangerous Ground – 1997 television film by Lawrence Gordon-Clark, based on the Jack Higgins novel, features bomb attacks on a U.S. president and a Chinese ambassador
 My Fellow Americans – 1996 comedy-thriller by Peter Segal in which two feuding former U.S. Presidents (Jack Lemmon, James Garner) are hunted by NSA agents under orders from the current Vice-President
 George Wallace – 1997 television film by John Frankenheimer about Alabama governor George Wallace (Gary Sinise) and his failed assassination in 1972
 The Assignment – 1997 film by Christian Duguay in which the CIA has a U.S. Navy officer (Aidan Quinn) impersonate terrorist Carlos the Jackal so that the KGB will assassinate the genuine Carlos
 Sharpe's Waterloo – 1997 television film by Tom Clegg in which Lt. Col. Sharpe (Sean Bean) fails to kill his commanding officer, the Dutch crown prince William, Prince of Orange, for cowardice at the 1815 Battle of Waterloo
 The Jackal – 1997 quasi-remake (of The Day of the Jackal) by Michael Caton-Jones where Russian gangsters dispatch an international assassin (Bruce Willis) to kill the FBI Director, and the agency (Sidney Poitier) seeks aid from an Irish terrorist (Richard Gere) and a Basque separatist (Mathilda May), but the actual target is discovered to be the wife of the U.S. President
 Air Force One – 1997 film by Wolfgang Petersen in which Russian neo-nationalists take over the U.S. President's plane, and execute White House staff, leaving the President (Harrison Ford) to fight to regain control
 The Peacekeeper – 1997 film by Frédéric Forestier in which a USAF officer (Dolph Lundgren) must foil the assassination of the U.S. President (Roy Scheider)
 Shadow Conspiracy – 1997 film by George P. Cosmatos about an aide (Charlie Sheen) who uncovers a plot against the U.S. President (Sam Waterston)
 A Further Gesture (a.k.a. The Break) – 1997 film by Robert Dornhelm where an IRA hitman (Stephen Rea) in New York City helps Guatemalan friends with their assassination plot
 Conspiracy Theory – 1997 film by Richard Donner in which a disturbed, conspiracy-obsessed cab driver (Mel Gibson) discovers he is a CIA assassin
 The Informant – 1997 film by Jim McBride where an IRA man becomes a 'supergrass' after being caught trying to assassinate a judge
 Grosse Pointe Blank – 1997 comedy by George Armitage about a depressed professional assassin (John Cusack) at his high school reunion
 Assassin(s) – 1997 French film by Mathieu Kassovitz about two professional killers, older (Michel Serrault) mentoring younger (Kassovitz)
 The Man Who Knew Too Little – 1997 spoof by Jon Amiel, starring Bill Murray as an American on vacation in England who is mistaken for a hitman involved in an assassination plot
 Anastasia – 1997 animated musical by Don Bluth in which Russian Grand Duchess Anastasia survives the murder of her family only to face assassination by the demonically-resurrected monk Rasputin and his friend, an albino bat
 The Last Contract – Swedish film from 1998 that presents its own theory about the assassination of the Prime Minister of Sweden Olof Palme. It stars British actor Michael Kitchen and Swedish actor Mikael Persbrandt in the leading roles.
 The Day Lincoln Was Shot – 1998 television film by John Gray about Good Friday, 1865 and the assassination plots directed at President Lincoln (Lance Henriksen), Vice President Johnson and Secretary of State Seward
 The Terrorist – 1998 Indian (Tamil) film by Santosh Sivan about a young woman assigned to assassinate a South Asian leader, based on the death of Indian PM Rajiv Gandhi in Tamil Nadu in 1991
 Jinnah – 1998 film by Jamil Dehlavi in which Muhammad Ali Jinnah (Christopher Lee), the founder of Pakistan, survives an assassination attempt by a Moslem extremist
 Elizabeth – 1998 film by Shekhar Kapur, where Elizabeth I (Cate Blanchett) avoids an assassination planned by the Duke of Norfolk in favour of Mary, Queen of Scots, inspired by the 1570 Ridolfi Plot
 Bulworth – 1998 comedy by Warren Beatty about a suicidal U.S. Senator (Beatty) who pays for his own assassination
 Ronin – 1998 film by John Frankenheimer about mercenaries (Robert De Niro, Jean Reno) hired to obtain a briefcase from its courier, and the murder of a figure skater (Katarina Witt)
 Execution of Justice – 1999 television film by Leon Ichaso about the murders of San Francisco mayor George Moscone and supervisor Harvey Milk (Peter Coyote) by a disgruntled coworker in 1978
 Go to Hell – 1999 comedy by Michael J. Heagle where a tabloid newspaper journalist can recover his soul only by assassinating a Catholic cardinal with demonic connections
 Ghost Dog: The Way of the Samurai – 1999 film by Jim Jarmusch about a Mafia hitman (Forest Whitaker) who follows the code of the samurai, inspired by Le Samouraï
 The World Is Not Enough – 1999 film by Michael Apted in which James Bond is assigned to retaliate for the assassination of a business tycoon within MI6 headquarters

2000s

2000–2002
 The Romanovs: A Crowned Family (Романовы. Венценосная семья) – 2000 film by Gleb Panfilov about the 1918 execution of Russian Tsar Nicholas II, his consort, Tsarina Alexandra, and their family and retainers
 Lumumba – 2000 film by Haitian director Raoul Peck about the overthrow and murder of Congolese Prime Minister Patrice Lumumba in 1961
 Hey Ram – 2000 Indian (Tamil) film by Kamal Haasan about a plot to assassinate Mahatma Gandhi
 When the Sky Falls – 2000 film by John Mackenzie about the murder of an Irish reporter (Joan Allen) by a Dublin drug gang, based on the 1996 Veronica Guerin case
  – 2000 film by Eric Till about the execution of anti-Nazi theologian Dietrich Bonhoeffer in Flossenbürg concentration camp in 1945
 Mission Kashmir – 2000 Indian (Hindi) film by Vidhu Vinod Chopra in which a plan by Kashmiri terrorists to assassinate the Indian PM proves to be only a ruse
 Chain of Command – 2000 TV film by John Terlesky in which the U.S. President (Roy Scheider) is kidnapped, along with his means for launching a nuclear onslaught
 Miss Congeniality – 2000 comedy by Donald Petrie about an FBI agent (Sandra Bullock) who exposes a plot to blow up a newly crowned beauty pageant winner
 Kandahar – 2001 Franco-Iranian (Dari) film by Mohsen Makhmalbaf, about an exile's return to Afghanistan, stars Dawud Salahuddin, in real life, an American-born assassin for Iranian intelligence
 O Processo dos Távoras – 2001 Portuguese RTP miniseries by Wilson Solon about the trial of members of the nobility accused in the attempted assassination of Portuguese King Joseph I in 1758
 Ayyam El Sadat – 2001 Egyptian film by Mohamed Khan about Egyptian President and Nobel laureate Anwar Sadat (Ahmad Zaki), assassinated along with other dignitaries in 1981 by Islamic extremists
 In the Time of the Butterflies – 2001 film by Mariano Barroso, starring Salma Hayek, about the 1960 murders of the three Mirabal sisters for their opposition to Dominican dictator Rafael Trujillo
 Quo Vadis – 2001 Polish remake by Jerzy Kawalerowicz, about the persecution of early Christians
 The Day Reagan Was Shot – 2001 television film by Cyrus Nowrasteh in which U.S. President Reagan and press secretary Brady are seriously wounded in a failed assassination in 1981
 Zoolander – 2001 comedy by Ben Stiller in which a vacuous male model (Stiller) is programmed to kill the Malaysian Prime Minister – banned in Malaysia
 2009 Lost Memories – 2002 South Korean film by Lee Si-myung in which An Jung-geun's assassination attempt against Itō Hirobumi in 1909 is thwarted, resulting in a time paradox where the Empire of Japan retains its overseas territories after World War II.
 The Sum of All Fears 2002 thriller in which Fascists plot to trigger a Third World War by framing the Russian Republic for nuking a championship football game attended by the U.S. President.
 Hero – 2002 Chinese film by Zhang Yimou centred on the assassination attempt directed at Qin Shi Huang, then King of Qin, by an enemy agent in 227 BC
 Frida – 2002 film by Julie Taymor about Mexican painter Frida Kahlo involves both Soviet exile Leon Trotsky (Geoffrey Rush) and his original, failed, assassin David Alfaro Siqueiros (Antonio Banderas), world-renowned mural painter and Stalinist
 RFK – 2002 television film by Robert Dornhelm about the life of U.S. politician Robert F. Kennedy from the assassination of his brother in 1963 to his own in 1968
 Jean Moulin – 2002 French television film by Yves Boisset about the death of Resistance leader Jean Moulin in Metz in 1943 after Gestapo torture
 Trudeau – 2002 CBC miniseries by Jerry Ciccoritti about Canadian PM Trudeau (Colm Feore), including the 1970 October Crisis and the assassination of Pierre Laporte
 The Dancer Upstairs – 2002 film by John Malkovich where the terrorist assassinations of government officials are investigated by a Latin American policeman (Javier Bardem) in spite of the imposition of martial law, inspired by the 1992 capture of the leader of Peru's Sendero Luminoso
 The Legend of Bhagat Singh – 2002 Indian (Hindi) film by Rajkumar Santoshi about Indian nationalist Bhagat Singh (Ajay Devgan) and the assassination of British police superintendent J.P. Saunders in 1928
 23 March 1931: Shaheed – 2002 Indian (Hindi) film by Guddu Dhanoa about Indian nationalist Bhagat Singh (Bobby Deol) and the assassination of British police superintendent J.P. Saunders in 1928
 Interview with the Assassin – 2002 mock documentary written and directed by Neil Burger, purportedly about the "second gunman" at the John F. Kennedy assassination.
 Nothing So Strange – 2002 film, directed by Brian Flemming in the style of an "independent documentary", centring on the fictional assassination of Microsoft's Bill Gates (which occurs before the end of the opening credits) and resonating with numerous references to the John F. Kennedy assassination in 1963
 The Quiet American – 2002 film by Phillip Noyce, set in Saigon in French Indochina, where an undercover CIA agent (Brendan Fraser) is assassinated
 The Bourne Identity – 2002 film by Doug Liman about an amnesiac CIA assassin (Matt Damon) and the assassination of a deposed African dictator (Adewale Akinnuoye-Agbaje)
 Sniper 2 – 2002 sequel by Craig R. Baxley about a former U.S. Marine sniper (Tom Berenger) targeting a Serbian general guilty of war crimes against Bosnian Muslims
 Assassination Tango – 2002 film by Robert Duvall where a hitman (Duvall), in Argentina to assassinate a general, becomes involved with a tango teacher
 Amir El Zalam – 2002 Egyptian film by Rami Imam in which a blind October War veteran confronts a foreign terrorist gang planning to assassinate a visiting politician
 Star Wars: Episode II – Attack of the Clones – 2002 science fiction film by George Lucas concerns the investigation by Jedi Master Obi-Wan Kenobi (Ewan McGregor) of a failed assassination directed at a Galactic Senator (Natalie Portman)
 Death to Smoochy – 2002 comedy by Danny DeVito about a plot to kill the popular host (Edward Norton) of a children's television show
 Die Another Day – 2002 film by Lee Tamahori that opens with James Bond on an assassination run

2003–2005
 Killing Hitler – 2003 docudrama by Jeremy Lovering about Operation Foxley, the 1944 British plan to kill Adolf Hitler

 Good Morning, Night – 2003 Italian film by Marco Bellocchio about the death of former Prime Minister Aldo Moro in 1978
 The Commission – 2003 film by Mark Sobel about the inner workings of the Commission chaired by U.S. Chief Justice Earl Warren as it investigates the 1963 Kennedy assassination and produces its controversial Warren Report
 Les Thibault – 2003 France 2 miniseries by Jean-Daniel Verhaeghe includes the assassination of Socialist leader and pacifist Jean Jaurès in 1914 by a right-wing nationalist
 The Reagans – 2003 Showtime miniseries by Robert Allan Ackerman includes the 1981 failed assassination in which U.S. President Reagan and press secretary Brady were seriously wounded
 06/05 – 2003 Dutch film by assassinated director Theo van Gogh about the assassination of politician Pim Fortuyn by an animal rights activist in 2002
 Veronica Guerin – 2003 film by Joel Schumacher about the 1996 murder of an Irish reporter, Veronica Guerin (Cate Blanchett), by a Dublin drug gang
 El Misterio Galíndez – 2003 Spanish film by Gerardo Herrero, starring Harvey Keitel, about the New York disappearance of a writer opposed to Dominican dictator Rafael Trujillo, based on the 1956 case of Basque Columbia University professor Jesús de Galíndez
 Tears of the Sun – 2003 remake (of Dark of the Sun) by Antoine Fuqua, set during a fictional Nigerian Civil War, begins with the off-screen assassination of the President (and family) by rebels, along with other echoes of the 1994 Rwandan genocide
 Imperium: Augustus – 2003 British/RAI miniseries by Roger Young about Roman Emperor Augustus (Peter O'Toole) and an unhistorical plot by Iullus Antonius (Juan Diego Botto), the son of Mark Antony
 The Statement – 2003 film by Norman Jewison about a war criminal and former member of the Vichy Milice (Michael Caine) who is targeted by, apparently, Jewish assassins
 Blind Horizon – 2003 film by Michael Haussman about an amnesiac (Val Kilmer) with recollections of his involvement in an assassination plot against the U.S. President
 The Hunted – 2003 film by William Friedkin about assassins hunting other assassins
 The Hebrew Hammer – 2003 comedy by Jonathan Kesselman where Santa Claus is assassinated by his own son (Andy Dick) and holiday harmony must be restored by a Jewish crime fighter in a pimpmobile (Adam Goldberg)
 Children of Dune – 2003 miniseries by Greg Yaitanes
 X2 – 2003 film by Bryan Singer where an attempted assassination of the U.S. President is a pretext for a general war of human against mutant
 Head of State – 2003 comedy by Chris Rock in which an alderman (Rock) becomes the first black candidate for U.S. President and imagines his own assassination
 Alexander – 2004 film by Oliver Stone in which Alexander the Great (Colin Farrell) ascends the throne of Macedon after the assassination of King Philip (Val Kilmer) in 336 B.C., then campaigns through Africa and Asia until his suspicious death in 323 B.C..
 Gunpowder, Treason & Plot – 2004 BBC miniseries by Gillies MacKinnon about the 1605 Gunpowder Plot to blow up Parliament and King James VI and I
 Stauffenberg (a.k.a. Operation Valkyrie) – 2004 German television film by Jo Baier about the Stauffenberg plot against Adolf Hitler, starring Sebastian Koch
 Die Stunde der Offiziere – 2004 German television film by Hans-Erich Viet about various plans to kill Adolf Hitler, culminating in the Stauffenberg plot, starring Harald Schrott
 Helter Skelter – 2004 television film by John Gray, starring Jeremy Davies, about the Charles Manson Family murders, the Family including Squeaky Fromme, would-be 1975 assassin of President Ford
 H2O – 2004 CBC miniseries by Charles Binamé where the Canadian PM dies in an apparent canoeing accident, but suspicions point to the Americans
 The Manchurian Candidate – 2004 remake by Jonathan Demme in which a U.S. Gulf War veteran (Liev Schreiber) is brainwashed into being a corporate agent who, as Vice-President, will assume the Presidency once the newly elected President is assassinated by his former comrade (Denzel Washington), brainwashed into acting as a hitman
 A Line in the Sand – 2004 television film by James Hawes in which the Iranians dispatch an assassin to punish a U.K. weapons expert who had spied on them
 Kill Bill: Volume 1 and Volume 2 – 2004 films by Quentin Tarantino about an assassin (Uma Thurman), seeking vengeance against her former allies after they kill her fiancé and unborn child
 Collateral – 2004 film by Michael Mann in which a hitman (Tom Cruise) enlists a cabbie (Jamie Foxx) in his work
 Man on Fire – 2004 film by Tony Scott about a bodyguard and ex-CIA assassin in Mexico (Denzel Washington) whose young charge is kidnapped – remake of the 1987 film, set in Italy
 The President's Last Bang – 2005 South Korean black comedy by Im Sang-soo about the assassination of President Park Chung-hee in 1979 by his own KCIA Director of intelligence and friend
 The Feast of the Goat – 2005 Anglo-Spanish film by Luis Llosa about the assassination in 1961 of Rafael Trujillo, Dominican caudillo and occasional President, based on the novel by Mario Vargas Llosa
 Sometimes in April – 2005 television film by Raoul Peck in which the assassinations of Rwandan President Habyarimana, Burundian President Ntaryamira and Rwandan PM Uwilingiyimana initiate the 1994 Genocide
 The Persistence of Dreams – 2005 short by Erik Courtney depicts U.S. President Lincoln's final moments in 1865, in the boarding house across the street from Ford's Theatre
 Joseph Smith: Prophet of the Restoration – 2005 film by T.C. Christensen and Gary Cook about the death of Joseph Smith (Nathan Mitchell), founder of the Latter Day Saint movement, and his brother Hyrum in 1844 by an Illinois mob
 Magnicidio – Complot en Lomas Taurinas – 2005 Mexican film by Miguel Marte about the 1994 assassination of PRI presidential candidate Luis Donaldo Colosio by a lone gunman
 Pope John Paul II – 2005 CBS miniseries by John Kent Harrison in which the Pope (Jon Voight) survives an assassination attempt by a Turkish assassin in 1981
 Munich – 2005 film by Steven Spielberg about the hunt for those purportedly involved in the 1972 Munich massacre
 The Assassination of Richard Nixon – 2005 film by Niels Mueller about the attempted assassination, by hijacked airliner, of President Nixon, based on the suppressed 1974 Samuel Byck case
 Maine Gandhi Ko Nahin Mara (I Did Not Kill Gandhi) – 2005 Indian (Hindi) film by Jahnu Barua about a retired university lecturer (Anupam Kher), suffering from early symptoms of Alzheimer's, who suddenly claims to have not killed Mahatma Gandhi in 1948
 Paradise Now – Oscar-nominated 2005 Dutch-Israeli (Arabic) film by Hany Abu-Assad where two Palestinian suicide bombers in Nablus, despairing of living under unending foreign occupation, are assigned a wedding in Tel Aviv, in retaliation for Israeli assassinations
 Syriana – 2005 film by Stephen Gaghan about a CIA assassin (George Clooney) who is assigned to kill the foreign minister of an Arab emirate
 The Interpreter – 2005 film by Sydney Pollack about a United Nations interpreter (Nicole Kidman) who overhears a plot to assassinate a visiting African President
 The State Counsellor – 2005 Russian film by Filipp Yankovsky in which a detective (Oleg Menshikov) in 1891 tries to prevent the assassination of the Tsarist Governor of Moscow by revolutionaries
 Left Behind: World at War – 2005 film by Craig R. Baxley in which the U.S. President (Louis Gossett) tries to assassinate Nicolae Carpathia, the Secretary-General of the UN and the Antichrist, but fails
 Star Wars: Episode III – Revenge of the Sith – 2005 science fiction film by George Lucas in which the Chancellor (Ian McDiarmid) employs assassins, including Darth Vader (Hayden Christensen), against his Jedi opposition
 Æon Flux – 2005 science fiction film by Karyn Kusama where a rebel assassin (Charlize Theron) is assigned to kill the leader of her city-state (Marton Csokas)
 The Matador – 2005 comedy by Richard Shepard about an aging bisexual hitman (Pierce Brosnan) who wants to retire

2006–2007
 Bobby – 2006 film by Emilio Estevez about the assassination of U.S. presidential candidate Robert F. Kennedy in 1968 by an Arab nationalist
 The Killing of John Lennon – 2006 film by Andrew Piddington about the 1980 murder of former Beatle John Lennon by a delusional Christian fan (Jonas Ball)
 Me Nathuram Godse Boltoy – 2006 Indian (Marathi) film about the assassin of Mahatma Gandhi, based on the banned play by Pradeep Dalavi
 October 1970 – 2006 CBC miniseries by Don McBrearty about the assassination of Quebec Labour Minister Pierre Laporte by FLQ terrorists during the 1970 October Crisis
 Lilís – 2006 Dominican film by Jimmy Sierra about Dominican dictator Ulises Heureaux and his assassination in 1899
 Karol: The Pope, The Man – 2006 miniseries by Giacomo Battiato, about the papacy of John Paul II (Piotr Adamczyk), involves the assassinations of Salvadoran archbishop Óscar Romero, Polish priest Jerzy Popiełuszko, Italian magistrate Paolo Borsellino, and the "Romeo and Juliet of Sarajevo", as well as the 1981 wounding of the Pope by a Turkish assassin, sponsored by the Soviets and Turkish terrorists
 Oswald's Traces – 2006 Dutch film by Cindy Jansen in which an activist prepares to murder politician Pim Fortuyn in 2002
 The Last King of Scotland – 2006 film by Kevin Macdonald in which Ugandan President Idi Amin (Forest Whitaker) eliminates those whom he dislikes, provoking his physician (James McAvoy) to plot his assassination
 The Way I Spent the End of the World – 2006 Romanian film by Cătălin Mitulescu about a seven-year-old boy who decides to assassinate dictator Nicolae Ceauşescu with friends from the school choir
 Death of a President – 2006 fictional documentary by Gabriel Range recalling the 2007 assassination of President George W. Bush in Chicago
 The Wind That Shakes the Barley – Palme d'Or-winning 2006 film by Ken Loach about political violence in 1920 during the Anglo-Irish War, starring Cillian Murphy
 All the King's Men – 2006 remake by Steven Zaillian about the assassination of Southern governor Willie Stark (Sean Penn), inspired by the 1935 death of Louisiana governor Huey Long
 Bordertown – 2006 film by Gregory Nava about the killing of a newspaper editor (Antonio Banderas) who publicizes the murders of maquiladora workers in Ciudad Juárez, Mexico
 American Dreamz – 2006 satire by Paul Weitz about a terrorist plot against a strongly Bush-like U.S. President (Dennis Quaid) when he appears as a guest judge on a strongly Pop Idol-like TV programme
 Land of the Blind – 2006 film by Robert Edwards in which the despotic king (Tom Hollander) and queen (Lara Flynn Boyle) of Everycountry  are overthrown and killed by a rebel leader (Donald Sutherland)
 Rang De Basanti – 2006 Indian (Hindi) film by Rakeysh Omprakash Mehra in which a group of university students becomes radicalized while making a movie about the assassination of British police superintendent J.P. Saunders in 1928, so when they, and other anti-corruption protesters, are badly beaten by police colluding with Hindu extremists, one (Aamir Khan) volunteers to kill the Defence Minister
 V for Vendetta – 2006 film by the Wachowskis wherein the main character, known only as V, inspired by the 1605 Gunpowder Plot, assassinates numerous governmental and quasi-governmental officials in his quest to topple a fascist regime; based on the graphic novel by Alan Moore
 End Game – 2006 film by Andy Cheng in which the assassination of the U.S. President leads to a series of other murders, starring Cuba Gooding
 The Sentinel – 2006 film by Clark Johnson about a plot within the Secret Service to assassinate the U.S. President, starring Michael Douglas
 The Contract – 2006 film by Bruce Beresford in which a notorious assassin (Morgan Freeman), presumably targeting the U.S. President, is himself targeted while under arrest by a citizen (John Cusack)
 Casino Royale – 2006 film by Martin Campbell that shows how James Bond (Daniel Craig) first became "licensed to kill", through two assassinations
 Shake Hands with the Devil – 2007 film by Roger Spottiswoode, starring Roy Dupuis, in which the assassination of President Juvénal Habyarimana triggers the 1994 Rwandan genocide – the same incident killed Burundian President Cyprien Ntaryamira
 Il Capo dei Capi – 2007 Italian Canale 5 miniseries by Alexis Sweet and Enzo Monteleone about the murders of Italian lawmen Giovanni Falcone and Paolo Borsellino, and others, through the 1960s and 1970s, by Sicilian mafiosi
 Héroes, la gloria tiene su precio – 2007 Chilean Canal 13 miniseries by Cristián Galaz et al., about 19th-century Chilean history, includes the murder of statesman Diego Portales (Carlos Concha) by a coup plotter in 1837
 National Treasure 2: Book of Secrets – 2007 sequel by Jon Turteltaub which opens with the 1865 assassination of U.S. President Lincoln in Ford's Theatre during a performance of Our American Cousin
 Kuppi – 2007 Indian (Tamil) film based on the assassination of Indian PM Rajiv Gandhi in Tamil Nadu in 1991
 Elizabeth: The Golden Age – 2007 film by Shekhar Kapur, where Queen Elizabeth I (Cate Blanchett) learns of an assassination plot against her by Mary, Queen of Scots and Anthony Babington, based on the 1586 Babington Plot

 Blood on the Moon – 2007 television film by Dennis Beauchamp about the trial of Fenian Patrick J. Whelan for the 1868 assassination of Canadian Father of Confederation, D'Arcy McGee
 Chapter 27 – 2007 film by J.P. Schaefer about the 1980 murder of former Beatle John Lennon by a delusional Christian fan (Jared Leto)
 September Dawn – 2007 film by Christopher Cain, about the 1857 Mountain Meadows massacre of settlers by Mormons, includes the 1844 death of Joseph Smith (Dean Cain), founder of the Latter Day Saint movement
 A Mighty Heart – 2007 film by Michael Winterbottom about the murder of journalist Daniel Pearl (Dan Futterman) by Islamist terrorists in 2002
 The Warlords – 2007 Chinese (Mandarin) film by Peter Chan about the assassination of a Qing general (Jet Li), based on the death of Ma Xinyi in 1870
 13 Roses – 2007 Spanish film by Emilio Martínez Lázaro about the fate of 13 young women when rumours of an assassination plot against Generalissimo Franco circulate after the Fall of Madrid in 1939
 The Assassination of Jesse James by the Coward Robert Ford – 2007 film by Andrew Dominik about the murder of outlaw Jesse James (Brad Pitt) by his friend Robert Ford (Casey Affleck) in 1882, and then Ford's own assassination in 1892
 The Hunting Party – 2007 film by Richard Shepard in which journalists (Richard Gere, Terrence Howard) in Bosnia attempting to contact a Serb war criminal are mistaken for CIA assassins, inspired by actual events centred on Radovan Karadžić
 Goodbye Bafana (a.k.a. The Color of Freedom) – 2007 film by Bille August, about Nelson Mandela's prison guard (Joseph Fiennes), includes speculation about the car crash death of Mandela's son, Thembi, in 1969
 Lust, Caution – 2007 film by Ang Lee where, during the Sino-Japanese War, a group of Hong Kong students plot to kill a visiting official (Tony Leung) of the collaborationist Wang Jingwei government
 Mein Führer – Die wirklich wahrste Wahrheit über Adolf Hitler (a.k.a. Mein Führer: The Truly Truest Truth About Adolf Hitler) – 2007 German satire by Dani Levy in which Adolf Hitler (Helge Schneider) avoids assassination by his Jewish drama teacher (Ulrich Mühe)
 Shooter – 2007 film by Antoine Fuqua about a recluse (Mark Wahlberg) set up to be the lone gunman in an apparent assassination attempt on the U.S. president
 Hitman – 2007 film by Xavier Gens based on the popular video game franchise of the same name, in the movie a genetically engineered assassin known only as "Agent 47" (Timothy Olyphant) who targets the Russian President

2008–2009
 Il Divo – 2008 Italian film by Paolo Sorrentino about Italian PM Giulio Andreotti (Toni Servillo) and the murders of journalist Mino Pecorelli, Carabinieri general Carlo Alberto Dalla Chiesa, bankers Michele Sindona and Roberto Calvi, and PM Aldo Moro

 Jodhaa Akbar – 2008 Indian (Hindustani) film by Ashutosh Gowariker includes the assassination of the Prime Minister of the Mughal Empire, Shamsuddin Atka Khan, by Adham Khan in 1562, as well as two attempts against Emperor Akbar (Hrithik Roshan), orchestrated by his brother-in-law
 Valkyrie – 2008 film by Bryan Singer about the Stauffenberg plot against Adolf Hitler, starring Tom Cruise
 The Devil's Whore – 2008 Channel 4 miniseries by Marc Munden, set during the English Civil War, in which a disillusioned officer plots the assassination of Oliver Cromwell (Dominic West) until his arrest in 1657
 Che – 2008 film by Steven Soderbergh in which Argentine revolutionary Ernesto "Che" Guevara (Benicio del Toro) meets his death in Bolivia in 1967
 Che Guevara – 2008 film by Josh Evans in which Argentine revolutionary Ernesto "Che" Guevara (Eduardo Noriega) meets his death in Bolivia in 1967
 House of Saddam – 2008 BBC/HBO miniseries by Alex Holmes and Jim O'Hanlon includes the 1982 failed assassination of then-U.S. ally Saddam Hussein (Yigal Naor) in Dujail by Islamic terrorists, but grossly exaggerates the reaction of the Iraqi government
 Milk – 2008 film by Gus Van Sant about the murders of San Francisco mayor George Moscone and supervisor Harvey Milk (Sean Penn) by a disgruntled coworker in 1978
 The Baader Meinhof Complex – 2008 Oscar-nominated German film by Uli Edel about the Baader Meinhof Gang and their assassinations of prominent citizens – Siegfried Buback, Jürgen Ponto, Hanns Martin Schleyer – in 1977
 Flame & Citron – 2008 Danish film by Ole Christian Madsen about the two principal assassins of the anti-Nazi Danish Resistance
 Les Femmes de l'Ombre – 2008 French film by Jean-Paul Salomé in which a group of French female SOE agents are sent to Normandy in 1944 to assassinate an SS colonel, based on the story of Lisé de Baissac
 Hitler is kaput! (Гитлер капут!) – 2008 Russian comedy by Marius Waisberg where Soviet agents go after Adolf Hitler and Eva Braun with the aid of an American rapper (Timati)
 Eagle Eye – 2008 film by D.J. Caruso in which an indignant computer system, outraged by a U.S. war crime, uses ordinary citizens (Shia LaBeouf, Michelle Monaghan) to wipe out the entire upper echelon of the U.S. government, and impose a President of its own choosing
 Vantage Point – 2008 film by Pete Travis about the seeming assassination of a U.S. President (William Hurt) in Spain
 XIII – 2008 Canal+ miniseries by Duane Clark in which the first female U.S. President (Mimi Kuzyk) is assassinated, and an amnesiac (Stephen Dorff) is suspected
 Nothing But the Truth – 2008 film by Rod Lurie where the shooting of the U.S. President leads to war with Venezuela and the assassination of a CIA agent
 Bangkok Dangerous – 2008 film by the Pang Brothers in which a hitman (Nicolas Cage), following a series of hits on crime lords, learns that he has been assigned the Thai Prime Minister as his final target
 Get Smart – 2008 comedy by Peter Segal includes a plot to kill the U.S. President (James Caan) during a concert with a nuclear blast
 War, Inc. – 2008 satire by Joshua Seftel where, in Central Asia, after the first fully privatized war, a corporate assassin (John Cusack) is sent to kill a competing conglomerate's natural gas executive – a semi-sequel to Grosse Pointe Blank
 The Dark Knight – 2008 film by Christopher Nolan includes the Joker's assassination of the Gotham City police commissioner, amongst others
 La Linea – 2008 film by James Cotten about a hitman (Ray Liotta) tracking a Tijuana drug lord
 Wanted – 2008 film by Timur Bekmambetov about an overstressed accountant (James McAvoy) who becomes involved with a hypermasculine girl assassin (Angelina Jolie) from an assassins' "fraternity"
 The White Ribbon – 2009 German language film by Michael Haneke ends with the 1914 assassination of Austrian Archduke Franz Ferdinand
 Trópico de Sangre – 2009 Dominican film by Juan Delancer, starring Michelle Rodriguez, about the 1960 murders of the three Mirabal sisters for their opposition to Dominican dictator Rafael Trujillo

 Henri IV (a.k.a. Henri 4) – 2009 German film by Jo Baier involves the death of French King Henry IV in 1610
 The Young Victoria – 2009 film by Jean-Marc Vallée in which Queen Victoria survives an assassination attempt by a deranged young man in 1840
 Bodyguards and Assassins – 2009 Hong Kong film by Teddy Chan where China's Empress Dowager dispatches assassins to murder revolutionary leader Sun Yat-sen (Zhang Hanyu) in 1905
 Notorious – 2009 film by George Tillman, Jr. about the unsolved murders of rappers Tupac Shakur (Anthony Mackie) in 1996 and Notorious B.I.G. (Jamal Woolard) in 1997
 Me and Orson Welles – 2009 film by Richard Linklater about Orson Welles (Christian McKay) and his 1937 theatre production of Shakespeare's Julius Caesar
 Inglourious Basterds – 2009 film by Quentin Tarantino about two fictional plans to assassinate Adolf Hitler, one by a team of Jewish OSS agents, the other by a French Jew
 Pope Joan – 2009 film by Bernd Eichinger about Pope Joan (Johanna Wokalek), the legendary female English Pope
 Sherlock Holmes – 2009 film by Guy Ritchie about a plot to kill members of the Houses of Parliament with poison gas
 The International – 2009 film by Tom Tykwer about the murder of a candidate for Prime Minister of Italy
 Law Abiding Citizen – 2009 film by F. Gary Gray about the assassinations of Philadelphia city officials by an aggrieved family man (Gerard Butler)
 Frame of Mind – 2009 film by Carl T. Evans where a detective (Evans) discovers film showing a gunman on the grassy knoll at the time of U.S. President Kennedy's assassination in 1963
 Let Him Be – 2009 film by Peter McNamee which proposes that John Lennon survived his 1980 assassination, then went into hiding in rural Ontario, Canada
 Watchmen – 2009 science fiction film by Zack Snyder, about a conspiracy to assassinate retired superheroes, based on the graphic novel by Alan Moore, also includes a recreation of the 1963 Kennedy assassination
 Harry Potter and the Half-Blood Prince – 2009 fantasy film by David Yates in which a Hogwarts student is assigned to assassinate headmaster Albus Dumbledore (Michael Gambon)
 Assassination of a High School President – 2009 film by Brett Simon in which a disgraced student council president takes aim at his successor

2010s

 The Conspirator – 2010 film by Robert Redford about Mary Surratt (Robin Wright Penn) and the 1865 Abraham Lincoln assassination
 Formosa Betrayed – 2010 film by Adam Kane in which the murder of a Taiwanese-American professor takes an FBI agent (James Van Der Beek) to Taiwan, based on two murders which occurred in 1981 and 1984
 Robin Hood – 2010 film by Ridley Scott features an assassination plot against King Richard the Lionheart but he is killed first in battle (A.D. 1199)
 Prince of Persia: The Sands of Time – 2010 film by Mike Newell which begins with the poisoning of the Persian king
 The Ghost – 2010 film by Roman Polanski which includes the assassination of a former U.K. PM (Pierce Brosnan)
 Salt – 2010 film by Phillip Noyce in which Soviet-era moles target the Russian and American presidents
 Red – 2010 film by Robert Schwentke where a retired CIA agent (Bruce Willis) pursues a plan to kill a war criminal, the U.S. Vice President
 The Expendables – 2010 film by Sylvester Stallone about a multinational military force (Stallone, Jason Statham, Jet Li, others) tasked with assassinating a South American dictator
 Green Zone – 2010 film by Paul Greengrass about a U.S. soldier (Matt Damon) who tries to prevent the assassination of an Iraqi general by U.S. government death squads
 Machete – 2010 film by Robert Rodriguez about a former Mexican federale (Danny Trejo) whose assassination of a corrupt U.S. senator goes awry
 Edge of Darkness – 2010 film by Martin Campbell about the murder of a corporate whistleblower and the investigation by her father (Mel Gibson)
 The American – 2010 film by Anton Corbijn
 The Kennedys – 2011 History Television/ReelzChannel miniseries by Jon Cassar where U.S. President Jack Kennedy (Greg Kinnear) is killed by a Dallas Book Depository employee who is then killed, while his brother Bobby (Barry Pepper) is killed five years later
 El asesinato de Carrero Blanco – 2011 ETB miniseries by Miguel Bardem about the assassination of Luis Carrero Blanco (José Ángel Egido), Francisco Franco's Prime Minister, by the ETA in 1973
 J. Edgar – 2011 film by Clint Eastwood about FBI director J. Edgar Hoover includes the 1919 anarchist bomb attacks against U.S. Attorney General A. Mitchell Palmer and others
 The Devil's Double – 2011 film by Lee Tamahori involves several attempted assassinations of Saddam Hussein's eldest son Uday (Dominic Cooper), or Uday's double, Latif Yahia (Cooper)
 Killer Elite – 2011 remake by Gary McKendry in which ex-Special Forces hitmen try to kill ex-SAS men, including author Ranulph Fiennes, over a grudge about a 1972 Omani battle
 Salmon Fishing in the Yemen – 2011 film by Lasse Hallström with an attempt on a Yemeni sheikh (Amr Waked) for bringing water to the desert against God's will
 The Double – 2011 film by Michael Brandt involving the murder of a U.S. Senator
The Mechanic – 2011 remake by Simon West about a hitman (Jason Statham), his protégé (Ben Foster), a drug lord, and a TV evangelist
Assassination Games – 2011 film by Ernie Barbarash where two hitmen team up against a drug lord
 Colombiana – 2011 film by Olivier Megaton about a Chicago hitwoman (Zoe Saldana) with a grudge against a CIA asset, a Colombian ganglord
 Hanna – 2011 film by Joe Wright about a bio-engineered girl (Saoirse Ronan) who tries to kill the intelligence agent responsible (Cate Blanchett)
 God Bless America – 2011 comedy by Bobcat Goldthwait in which two angry citizens (Joel Murray, Tara Lynne Barr) target rightwing extremists and narcissistic TV personalities
 Zero Dark Thirty – 2012 film by Kathryn Bigelow about the 2011 U.S. assassination of terrorist Osama bin Laden
 The Dictator – 2012 comedy by Larry Charles which features several attempts on the life of a North African dictator (Sacha Baron Cohen)
 Snow White and the Huntsman – 2012 fantasy film by Rupert Sanders where an evil queen (Charlize Theron) decides to murder her possible successor, Snow White (Kristen Stewart)
 Men in Black 3 – 2012 science fiction film by Barry Sonnenfeld where Agent J (Will Smith) must prevent his partner's assassination back in 1969
 Lincoln – 2012 film by Steven Spielberg; the film ends with his assassination in 1865
 Olympus Has Fallen – 2013 action thriller film in which North Korean terrorists attack Washington, D.C. and take over the White House in which they assassinate the South Korean Prime Minister during a visit and also attempt to assassinate the President of the United States
 White House Down – 2013 action thriller movie by Roland Emmerich in which a paramilitary group take over the White House and attempt to assassinate the President of the United States
 Captain America: The Winter Soldier – 2014 superhero film in which S.H.I.E.L.D. director Nick Fury endures repeated assassination attempts while looking into a conspiracy inside his organization
 The Interview – 2014 movie where a TV show host assassinates the dictator of North Korea
 Heneral Luna – 2015 film by Jerrold Tarog; the film ends with his assassination in 1899
Hitman: Agent 47 – 2015 reboot of the 2007 Hitman movie, again based on the same video game series.
 Kingsman: The Secret Service – 2015 spy movie where a madman plans to depopulate Earth by using his personal technology (MP3 players and cellphones) to trigger people's combative instincts, driving them to attack and kill one another
 The Purge: Election Year – 2016 dystopian science fiction action horror film by James DeMonaco in which Caleb Warrens, the Leader of the "New Founding Fathers of America", and the other NFFA members are killed by a group of rebels in a cathedral, during the film

In development

 Tlatelolco: Mexico 68 – 2012 film by Carlos Bolado, currently in pre-production, about a journalist (Ryan Phillippe, rumoured) and the 1968 Tlatelolco massacre of student activists by Mexican President Díaz Ordaz
 The Amateur – 2012 remake, currently in development
 I, Claudius – 2013 remake by Jim Sheridan, currently in development, on political violence in ancient Rome, as observed by Emperor Claudius
 The Devil in the White City – 2013 film, currently in development, includes the assassination of Chicago Mayor Carter Harrison, Sr.
 Hitman 2 – 2013 sequel, currently in development, about a genetically engineered assassin known only as "Agent 47" (Timothy Olyphant)
 The Perfect Assassin – 2013 film, currently in development
 Death Note – 2014 film by Shane Black, currently in development
 Manhunt – 201x film, currently in development, about the aftermath of the Lincoln assassination, based on Manhunt: The 12-Day Chase for Lincoln's Killer, by James L. Swanson
 Man's Fate – 201x film by Michael Cimino, currently in development

Assassinated filmmakers

One direct and one indirect victim of terrorism.
 Theo van Gogh (1957–2004) – provocative Dutch producer/director
 Submission (2004)
 Interview (2007), an English-language remake by Steve Buscemi of van Gogh's 2003 film
 Moustapha Akkad (1930–2005) – provocative Syrian producer/director
 The Message (a.k.a. ar-Risālah) (1976) – a respectful, subjective-camera telling of the life of the Prophet of Islam – informative for أهل الكتاب (People of the Book)
 Lion of the Desert (a.k.a. Omar Mukhtar) (1981) – about Omar Mukhtar, and Libyan resistance to Italy replacing the Ottoman Empire as colonial power – a subject not otherwise addressed in an English-language film

Television
 Playhouse 90 (1956–1960) – The 1958 episode "The Plot To Kill Stalin" involved a plot against Uncle Joe (Melvyn Douglas).

 On Trial (1960) – a series of dramatizations of important U.K. legal cases, including the case of Governor Joseph Wall. In that episode, Spencer Perceval appears as a character. Perceval is the only British Prime Minister to have been assassinated (in 1812).
 The Time Tunnel (1966–1967) – The episode "The Death Trap" involves both the 1865 assassination of U.S. President Lincoln and the 1861 conspiracy against him, known as the "Baltimore Plot".
 Star Trek (1966–1969) – In the episode "Journey to Babel", the Tellarite ambassador is assassinated and an attempt is made on the life of Captain James T. Kirk. In the episode "The Savage Curtain", U.S. President Abraham Lincoln is murdered, but in battle on an alien world.
 Saturday Night Live (1975–present) – Nightline broadcaster Ted Koppel (Joe Piscopo) reports as famous but incomprehensible actor Buckwheat (Eddie Murphy) is assassinated on live television, and then Buckwheat's assassin (Murphy again) is assassinated in turn.
 Red Dwarf (1988–1999) – The episode "Tikka to Ride" features an elaborate plot which takes place in an alternate timeline where JFK survives due to accidental interference by the Red Dwarf crew. After witnessing the negative result of his survival the crew enlist Kennedy to go back in time to carry out the assassination. The plan works: Kennedy shoots his past self and the timeline is restored. Kennedy grimly thanks the gang for the chance to restore himself to his proper place in history, and fades away as a result of the resetting timeline.
 Quantum Leap (1989–1993) – The episode "Lee Harvey Oswald" concerns the assassination of U.S. President John F. Kennedy.
 Babylon 5 (1993–1998) – features several assassinations (meaning the targeted killing of a significant political figure, rather than the many other deaths or murders that occur in the show). One of the earliest assassinations is of Earth's President Santiago, in a spectacular scene showing the explosion of the Presidential Spaceship, Earth Force One. The same episode shows his Vice-President Clark being sworn in. The scene is shot as a replica of the swearing in of LBJ, following the JFK assassination, complete with Santiago's widow posed in the background. Clark's assumption of power begins Earth's slow decline into fascism, and it was discovered his faction arranged the assassination of President Santiago.
 La Femme Nikita (1997–2001) – a television spy drama, based on the French film Nikita, starring Peta Wilson and Roy Dupuis as assassins who work in a secret government counter-terrorist organization, "Section One". Section One's operatives (assassins) work not for monetary gain nor from ideological devotion, but out of a fear of being cancelled (executed) for sub-standard performance. La Femme Nikita had a run of five seasons and a total of 96 episodes; during its first two seasons, it was the highest-rated drama on American basic cable. Joel Surnow and Robert Cochran, who created and produced La Femme Nikita, later went on to create 24.
 Freaks and Geeks (1999–2000) – Episode 15, "Noshing and Moshing", is set at the time of the assassination attempt on U.S. President Reagan. One character believes that it was the result of a conspiracy organized by Vice-President Bush.
 The West Wing (1999–2006) – In the first-season finale, in the episode "What Kind of Day Has It Been" there is an assassination attempt on U.S. President Bartlet's personal aide, Charlie Young. It is, however, thwarted by the Secret Service. In the following episodes the assassins are discovered to have been members of an organization called Virginia White Pride, a group of racists and white supremacists. In the third season, President Bartlet orders the assassination of Qumari Defence Minister Abdul Ibn Shareef, after it comes to light that the latter has ordered a group of terrorists to blow up the Golden Gate Bridge and is plotting other terrorist acts.
 Alias (2001–2006) – Numerous assassinations, real and simulated, take place over the course of Sydney Bristow's odyssey through the underworld of covert intelligence and international organized crime.
 24 (2001–2010) – Assassination plots have featured prominently throughout: Season 1 revolves around Counter-Terrorist Unit agent Jack Bauer's attempts to stop the assassination of Democratic presidential candidate David Palmer. Season 2 ends with the attempted assassination of now-President Palmer. Season 3 involves the assassination by Jack Bauer of his superior Ryan Chappelle at the behest of terrorist Stephen Saunders. Season 4 features an attempt to assassinate U.S. President Keeler by shooting down Air Force One (and subsequently the assassination of the president's son). Season 5's plot begins with a hired killer assassinating former U.S. President David Palmer at the beginning of the first episode, along with the assassination of CTU employee Michelle Dessler. Later in the 13th episode, Christopher Henderson attempts to assassinate Michelle's husband Tony Almeida. Season 6 involves the attempted assassinations of U.S. President Wayne Palmer and former U.S. President Charles Logan. In season 7, the husband of president Allison Taylor is assassinated. In season 8, the president of a fictitious Middle-East country is assassinated; later, after his partner Renee Walker is assassinated, Jack Bauer goes on a killing spree, killing several Russian officials who were members of the conspiracy, and finally targets the Russian president, but his assassination attempt is thwarted by his friend Chloe O'Brien, now acting director of CTU. In 24: Live Another Day, U.S. president James Heller is targeted for assassination.
 Monk (2002–2009) – The pilot episode centres on the failed assassination of a mayoral candidate, while the first episode of Season 3 involves the murder of the Latvian ambassador in New York City. In Season 3 Episode 12, Monk himself becomes the target of Chinatown hitmen.
 NCIS (2003–present) – In Season 1, Episode 1 the death of a naval officer aboard Air Force One may represent an assassination attempt on ostensible U.S. President George W. Bush.
 Veronica Mars (2004–2007) – Roman Emperor Caligula is namechecked by Veronica (Kristen Bell) in Season 2, Episode 39, and two evil principal characters are assassinated in the season finale.
 Stargate Atlantis (2004–2009) – Several assassination attempts are featured through the series, the most extreme of them being the coup when Ladon Radim assassinates Chief Cowen and his Elite Guard with a hidden nuclear device, taking over as the new Genii leader. On another occasion, the protagonists narrowly protect the 13-year-old Harmony from an attempt on her life ordered by one of her sisters (in order to usurp her position as would-be queen). In yet another incident, Teyla (disguised as a Wraith Queen) and Todd infiltrate a Hive Ship under the guise of negotiations. However, Todd stabs the Queen to death and blames Teyla for it, resulting in her becoming the new Queen.
 Lost (2004–2010) – In Season 4, former Iraqi Army torturer Sayid Jarrah (Naveen Andrews) works as an assassin for the mysterious Ben Linus (Michael Emerson). In Season 6, Sayid again becomes an assassin, this time for the Smoke Monster (Terry O'Quinn).
 House (2004–2012) – In Season 6 episode "The Tyrant", a hospitalized African dictator (James Earl Jones) avoids one assassination attempt before being murdered by a doctor.
 Rome (2005–2006) – HBO/BBC/RAI series by Michael Apted et al. on wars, intrigue, and personal and political violence in ancient Rome. Season 1 includes the assassinations of several historical figures, Pompey, Pothinus, and Julius Caesar. Season 2 includes the assassination of Cicero but, unhistorically, omits Caesarion.
 Heroes (2006–2010) – In the finale of the second volume of Heroes, "Generations", former New York Congressman Nathan Petrelli gives a nationally televised speech to the media in Odessa, Texas, regarding the successful stopping of an outbreak of a deadly virus. About to reveal that he has the ability to fly, he is shot in the chest twice, mid-sentence, by an unknown assassin who quickly leaves the scene. Nathan falls into the arms of his brother, Peter, and uses his last breath to whisper his name.
 Robin Hood (2006–2009) – The story involves plots against the life of King Richard I of England.
 Reaper (2007) – President William McKinley's assassin Leon Czolgosz is the demon in "Leon", Episode 6 of the first season.
 Doctor Who (2005–present) – Series 3 episode 12 "The Sounds of the drums" U.S. President Arthur Coleman Winters was killed by UK Prime Minister Harold Saxon (The Master).
 The Tudors (2007–2010) – There is an assassination attempt against Anne Boleyn on the way to her coronation, in Episode 3 of Season 2.
 Burn Notice (2007–2013) – This series features several minor assassinations in order to cover up the conspiracy that burned spy Michael Weston (Jeffery Donnovan) investigates as he is attempting to clear his name after he becomes affiliated with it. His narration, in which he acts if he is teaching a class of new spies, also discusses the concept several times.
 Murdoch Mysteries (2007–present) – The Season 3 episode "The Murdoch Identity" involves a plot against Queen Victoria and her War Secretary in Bristol, England.
 IRIS (2009) – The South Korean TV series details a black ops agency named the National Security Service or NSS, an agency created by Park Chung-Hee that protected South Korea by operations including assassination. One of its agents, Kim Hyun-Jun, goes rogue after completing his assassination assignment in Hungary after being betrayed by NSS Director Baek San and threatened with assassination himself by his friend and fellow NSS operative Jin Sa-Woo. An arms-dealing terrorist group called IRIS also uses assassination to kill off anyone trying to rout out the group and prevent the Koreas from reuniting under peace talks.
 Warehouse 13 (2009–2014) – The pilot episode features an attempted assassination of the U.S. president at a Washington museum.
 The Event (2010–2011) – The story involves a U.S. presidential assassination attempt.
 Nikita (2010–2013) – An updating of the 1990s series, once again focusing on the exploits of a female assassin and her section.
 Designated Survivor (2016–present) – A bombing during the State of the Union address successfully assassinates almost the entirety of the United States government, with the protagonist assuming the role of President having been the former administration's designated survivor for the address.
 Hell on Wheels (2011–2016) – There is an assassination attempt against Brigham Young by his son Phineas in Episode 7 of Season 5.
Killing Eve (2018) – Eve Polastri, a desk-bound MI5 officer, begins to track down talented psychopathic assassin Villanelle, while both women become obsessed with each other.

Animation
 Golgo 13: The Professional – Directed by Osamu Dezaki, the anime is about a professional assassin.  Only two anime installments were made
 Golgo 13 – The TV series details more on Duke Togo's assassination missions
 Noir – Anime television series that follows two female assassins' search to understand their past
 Darker than Black – Anime television series about ordinary people inexplicably changed into Contractors with extraordinary abilities who typically become cold-blooded killers
 Assassination Classroom – Anime television series adapted from a manga by Yūsei Matsui, about junior high students in their school's worst class, tasked with finding a way to assassinate an extremely powerful creature claiming it destroyed 70% of the moon, and will destroy the Earth one year later

Board games
 The Plot to Assassinate Hitler (1976) – Published by SPI. One player represents the forces in Nazi Germany opposed to Hitler, both military and civilian, while the other player plays the Gestapo and SS. Prominent figures in the 20 July plot appear in the game as playing pieces, e.g. Canaris, Olbricht, Witzleben, Goerdeler

Video games
 Portopia Renzoku Satsujin Jiken (1983) – Adventure game focusing on a murder case in Kobe, Japan
 Golgo 13: Top Secret Episode (1988) and Golgo 13: The Mafat Conspiracy (1990) – two NES games based on the anime/manga
 Grand Theft Auto series (1997–2013) – features numerous missions which involve assassination
 Tenchu (1998–2008) – Same as above, the originator of the next-generation ninja subterfuge gaming genre. Released earlier, more story-driven and somewhat less political, assassination is a trademark feature of the series
 Hitman series (2000–present) – Popular tactical stealth game series which involves the assassination of various targets. There has been over eight games in the series so far. 
 Ragnarok Online (2001) – An MMORPG where the player can choose to become an assassin as a second job class
 Splinter Cell (2002) – Stealth action game which ends with an assassination of a powerful political leader
 The Elder Scrolls III: Morrowind (2002) – role-playing video game with numerous assassinations and even a guild dedicated to assassinations called the Morag Tong
 XIII (2003) – about an amnesiac and the assassination of a U.S. President
 Grand Chase (2003) – Lass, the Thief and the fourth character, is an assassin as a second job using a curved sword called Scimitar
 JFK Reloaded (2004) – The game's sole objective is to recreate the John F. Kennedy assassination
 Vampire: The Masquerade – Bloodlines (2004) – Several assignments (some mandatory, some optional) involving assassination are included in this game, and the endgame involves the player deciding whether to assassinate one or both of the game's vampire clan leader antagonists
 Shinobido (2005) – Heavily stealth-based video game centred around feudal-era Japan and its inhabitants. The protagonist is a ninja, who is given contact killing missions among others, and becomes a politically heavily involved reconnaissance agent, thief and mostly, assassin
 Total War (2006) – a strategy game series where the player can send assassins against opponents
 The Elder Scrolls IV: Oblivion (2006) – role-playing video game in which one may join an assassins' guild, the Dark Brotherhood. Also, the main storyline opens with an emperor being assassinated; the entire game hinges on this event
 The Godfather: The Game (2006) – the game features several missions with the goal to assassinating high-ranking members of the Five Families, including the Dons
 Assassin's Creed (2007) – Game in which one plays a member of the Hashshashin sect during the Third Crusade
 Team Fortress 2 (2007) – features one class, the spy, whose purpose is to assassinate other players. He features a knife among his weaponry that will kill instantly if it is a stab to the back of a character
 No More Heroes (2007) – The player is an assassin called Travis Touchdown who is the 11th ranked assassin of an organization called the UAA. The game leads the player to fight against the top 10 assassins of the UAA
 Call of Duty 4: Modern Warfare (2007) – In two missions, the player plays as a sniper on a failed assassination attempt
 Star Wars: Force Unleashed (2008) – The four first levels are a mission where the player attempts to assassinate Jedi masters
 Fable II (2008) – The player can be an assassin
 Call of Duty: World at War (2008) – In the first level of the Russian campaign, the player participates in the assassination of a Nazi general responsible for Stalingrad atrocities
 Fallout 3 (2008) – The player is tasked by an organization known as the Brotherhood of Steel to assassinate John Henry Eden, the self-proclaimed President of the United States
 MadWorld (2009) – The gameplay revolves around how creatively you murder other contestants in a game called "Deathwatch"
 Assassin's Creed II (2009) – The player assumes the role of a young nobleman-turned-assassin named Ezio Auditore da Firenze. The plot takes place in Renaissance Italy
 Assassin's Creed Brotherhood (2010) – Assassin Ezio Auditore da Firenze returns
 Call of Duty: Black Ops (2010) – Operatives Mason and Woods are sent to Cuba to assassinate Fidel Castro, but later find out that he had a lookalike. Another instance is when the player finds out that Mason was a conspirator in the John F. Kennedy assassination at the end of the game
 Just Cause (video game series) (2006–2018) – United States agent Rico travels to the fictional island-nations of San Esperito, Panau, Medici and Solis to assassinate the regime's corrupt dictators
 Fallout: New Vegas (2010) – The player can assassinate three major political leaders, then cannibalize them to receive a special in-game bonus, called a Perk
 Assassin's Creed: Revelations (2011) – Assassin Ezio Auditore da Firenze returns for the final time
 Batman: Arkham City (2011) – The secondary mission "Shot in the Dark" involves contract killings. The League of Assassins are also part of the main plot
 Assassin's Creed III (2012) – A new Assassin arises to the creed
 Dishonored (2012) – Corvo Attano sets out to assassinate a conspiracy line to restore the rightful Emperess, Emily Kaldwin, on the throne. There are non-lethal alternatives to assassination targets
 Payday 2 (2013) – the Payday gang assassinates Ernesto Sosa, a fictional drug lord, who had been attacking weapon shipments of 'The Butcher,' an arms smuggler.

See also
 History of assassination
 John F. Kennedy assassination in popular culture
 Politics in fiction
 Political fiction

Notes

Sources
 Cousins, Mark. The Story of Film, BCA, Pavilion Books, London, 2004.
 Hartley, William H., Ed.D. Selected Films for American History and Problems, Teachers College, Columbia University, New York, 1940.
 Lewis, Bernard. The Assassins: A Radical Sect in Islam, Weidenfeld & Nicolson, London, 1967; Phoenix, Orion Books, London, 2003.
 London, Jack. The Assassination Bureau, Ltd., McGraw-Hill, New York, 1963; Penguin Books, Harmondsworth, 1978.

 
Incomplete literature lists
Incomplete film, television, or video lists
Literature lists
History of fiction
Fiction